

487001–487100 

|-bgcolor=#E9E9E9
| 487001 ||  || — || March 6, 2013 || Haleakala || Pan-STARRS || — || align=right | 2.7 km || 
|-id=002 bgcolor=#d6d6d6
| 487002 ||  || — || January 19, 2012 || Haleakala || Pan-STARRS || — || align=right | 3.2 km || 
|-id=003 bgcolor=#d6d6d6
| 487003 ||  || — || July 6, 2014 || Haleakala || Pan-STARRS || — || align=right | 3.4 km || 
|-id=004 bgcolor=#fefefe
| 487004 ||  || — || September 21, 2003 || Kitt Peak || Spacewatch || — || align=right data-sort-value="0.95" | 950 m || 
|-id=005 bgcolor=#E9E9E9
| 487005 ||  || — || February 15, 2013 || Haleakala || Pan-STARRS || EUN || align=right | 1.1 km || 
|-id=006 bgcolor=#E9E9E9
| 487006 ||  || — || February 10, 2008 || Kitt Peak || Spacewatch || — || align=right | 1.7 km || 
|-id=007 bgcolor=#fefefe
| 487007 ||  || — || January 8, 2010 || Mount Lemmon || Mount Lemmon Survey || — || align=right data-sort-value="0.71" | 710 m || 
|-id=008 bgcolor=#E9E9E9
| 487008 ||  || — || January 29, 2009 || Mount Lemmon || Mount Lemmon Survey || — || align=right | 1.1 km || 
|-id=009 bgcolor=#E9E9E9
| 487009 ||  || — || January 17, 2013 || Kitt Peak || Spacewatch || — || align=right | 1.6 km || 
|-id=010 bgcolor=#E9E9E9
| 487010 ||  || — || July 2, 2014 || Catalina || CSS || JUN || align=right | 1.2 km || 
|-id=011 bgcolor=#d6d6d6
| 487011 ||  || — || May 6, 2014 || Haleakala || Pan-STARRS || Tj (2.92) || align=right | 3.9 km || 
|-id=012 bgcolor=#d6d6d6
| 487012 ||  || — || August 16, 2009 || La Sagra || OAM Obs. || — || align=right | 2.9 km || 
|-id=013 bgcolor=#d6d6d6
| 487013 ||  || — || June 2, 2014 || Haleakala || Pan-STARRS || — || align=right | 2.8 km || 
|-id=014 bgcolor=#d6d6d6
| 487014 ||  || — || December 3, 2010 || Kitt Peak || Spacewatch || — || align=right | 2.9 km || 
|-id=015 bgcolor=#d6d6d6
| 487015 ||  || — || February 23, 2012 || Mount Lemmon || Mount Lemmon Survey || — || align=right | 2.1 km || 
|-id=016 bgcolor=#E9E9E9
| 487016 ||  || — || February 26, 2009 || Kitt Peak || Spacewatch || — || align=right data-sort-value="0.80" | 800 m || 
|-id=017 bgcolor=#d6d6d6
| 487017 ||  || — || December 27, 2011 || Mount Lemmon || Mount Lemmon Survey || — || align=right | 2.7 km || 
|-id=018 bgcolor=#E9E9E9
| 487018 ||  || — || November 18, 2006 || Kitt Peak || Spacewatch || — || align=right | 1.6 km || 
|-id=019 bgcolor=#E9E9E9
| 487019 ||  || — || January 1, 2008 || Kitt Peak || Spacewatch || — || align=right | 1.3 km || 
|-id=020 bgcolor=#fefefe
| 487020 ||  || — || August 27, 1995 || Kitt Peak || Spacewatch || — || align=right data-sort-value="0.79" | 790 m || 
|-id=021 bgcolor=#d6d6d6
| 487021 ||  || — || June 25, 2014 || Mount Lemmon || Mount Lemmon Survey || — || align=right | 3.0 km || 
|-id=022 bgcolor=#E9E9E9
| 487022 ||  || — || February 28, 2008 || Mount Lemmon || Mount Lemmon Survey || — || align=right | 1.9 km || 
|-id=023 bgcolor=#E9E9E9
| 487023 ||  || — || February 8, 2008 || Kitt Peak || Spacewatch || — || align=right | 1.6 km || 
|-id=024 bgcolor=#d6d6d6
| 487024 ||  || — || September 13, 2004 || Kitt Peak || Spacewatch || — || align=right | 2.0 km || 
|-id=025 bgcolor=#d6d6d6
| 487025 ||  || — || July 2, 2014 || Haleakala || Pan-STARRS || — || align=right | 2.1 km || 
|-id=026 bgcolor=#fefefe
| 487026 ||  || — || March 5, 2006 || Kitt Peak || Spacewatch || NYS || align=right data-sort-value="0.51" | 510 m || 
|-id=027 bgcolor=#d6d6d6
| 487027 ||  || — || December 26, 2005 || Kitt Peak || Spacewatch || — || align=right | 2.7 km || 
|-id=028 bgcolor=#E9E9E9
| 487028 ||  || — || May 16, 2009 || Mount Lemmon || Mount Lemmon Survey || — || align=right | 1.6 km || 
|-id=029 bgcolor=#d6d6d6
| 487029 ||  || — || December 24, 2011 || Mount Lemmon || Mount Lemmon Survey || BRA || align=right | 1.4 km || 
|-id=030 bgcolor=#d6d6d6
| 487030 ||  || — || June 25, 2014 || Mount Lemmon || Mount Lemmon Survey || — || align=right | 2.7 km || 
|-id=031 bgcolor=#E9E9E9
| 487031 ||  || — || October 11, 2010 || Mount Lemmon || Mount Lemmon Survey || — || align=right | 1.8 km || 
|-id=032 bgcolor=#d6d6d6
| 487032 ||  || — || December 24, 2006 || Kitt Peak || Spacewatch || — || align=right | 2.1 km || 
|-id=033 bgcolor=#E9E9E9
| 487033 ||  || — || July 3, 2014 || Haleakala || Pan-STARRS || — || align=right | 1.2 km || 
|-id=034 bgcolor=#E9E9E9
| 487034 ||  || — || December 31, 2007 || Kitt Peak || Spacewatch || — || align=right | 1.4 km || 
|-id=035 bgcolor=#E9E9E9
| 487035 ||  || — || May 15, 2009 || Kitt Peak || Spacewatch || — || align=right | 1.6 km || 
|-id=036 bgcolor=#E9E9E9
| 487036 ||  || — || June 29, 2014 || Haleakala || Pan-STARRS || — || align=right | 1.7 km || 
|-id=037 bgcolor=#d6d6d6
| 487037 ||  || — || October 1, 2005 || Mount Lemmon || Mount Lemmon Survey || KOR || align=right | 1.1 km || 
|-id=038 bgcolor=#d6d6d6
| 487038 ||  || — || December 2, 2010 || Mount Lemmon || Mount Lemmon Survey || — || align=right | 2.9 km || 
|-id=039 bgcolor=#d6d6d6
| 487039 ||  || — || July 3, 2014 || Haleakala || Pan-STARRS || — || align=right | 3.0 km || 
|-id=040 bgcolor=#d6d6d6
| 487040 ||  || — || January 26, 2012 || Mount Lemmon || Mount Lemmon Survey || EOS || align=right | 1.7 km || 
|-id=041 bgcolor=#d6d6d6
| 487041 ||  || — || January 21, 2012 || Kitt Peak || Spacewatch || — || align=right | 2.5 km || 
|-id=042 bgcolor=#E9E9E9
| 487042 ||  || — || September 19, 2010 || Kitt Peak || Spacewatch || — || align=right | 1.5 km || 
|-id=043 bgcolor=#E9E9E9
| 487043 ||  || — || January 21, 2013 || Haleakala || Pan-STARRS || — || align=right | 1.4 km || 
|-id=044 bgcolor=#E9E9E9
| 487044 ||  || — || April 10, 2013 || Mount Lemmon || Mount Lemmon Survey || GEF || align=right | 1.1 km || 
|-id=045 bgcolor=#fefefe
| 487045 ||  || — || March 23, 2006 || Kitt Peak || Spacewatch || NYS || align=right data-sort-value="0.66" | 660 m || 
|-id=046 bgcolor=#E9E9E9
| 487046 ||  || — || November 17, 2006 || Mount Lemmon || Mount Lemmon Survey || — || align=right | 2.0 km || 
|-id=047 bgcolor=#d6d6d6
| 487047 ||  || — || June 27, 2014 || Haleakala || Pan-STARRS || — || align=right | 2.5 km || 
|-id=048 bgcolor=#d6d6d6
| 487048 ||  || — || July 25, 2014 || Haleakala || Pan-STARRS || — || align=right | 2.0 km || 
|-id=049 bgcolor=#d6d6d6
| 487049 ||  || — || September 23, 2009 || Mount Lemmon || Mount Lemmon Survey || — || align=right | 3.0 km || 
|-id=050 bgcolor=#d6d6d6
| 487050 ||  || — || July 25, 2014 || Haleakala || Pan-STARRS || — || align=right | 2.1 km || 
|-id=051 bgcolor=#d6d6d6
| 487051 ||  || — || February 3, 2012 || Mount Lemmon || Mount Lemmon Survey || EOS || align=right | 1.4 km || 
|-id=052 bgcolor=#d6d6d6
| 487052 ||  || — || June 27, 2014 || Haleakala || Pan-STARRS || — || align=right | 2.6 km || 
|-id=053 bgcolor=#d6d6d6
| 487053 ||  || — || April 19, 2013 || Haleakala || Pan-STARRS || — || align=right | 2.8 km || 
|-id=054 bgcolor=#d6d6d6
| 487054 ||  || — || January 28, 2007 || Kitt Peak || Spacewatch || — || align=right | 2.6 km || 
|-id=055 bgcolor=#E9E9E9
| 487055 ||  || — || April 21, 2009 || Kitt Peak || Spacewatch || — || align=right | 1.3 km || 
|-id=056 bgcolor=#d6d6d6
| 487056 ||  || — || January 21, 2012 || Haleakala || Pan-STARRS || EOS || align=right | 2.3 km || 
|-id=057 bgcolor=#d6d6d6
| 487057 ||  || — || February 17, 2007 || Kitt Peak || Spacewatch || TEL || align=right | 1.1 km || 
|-id=058 bgcolor=#d6d6d6
| 487058 ||  || — || October 31, 2010 || Mount Lemmon || Mount Lemmon Survey || — || align=right | 2.2 km || 
|-id=059 bgcolor=#fefefe
| 487059 ||  || — || February 13, 2013 || Haleakala || Pan-STARRS || — || align=right data-sort-value="0.96" | 960 m || 
|-id=060 bgcolor=#E9E9E9
| 487060 ||  || — || February 15, 2013 || Haleakala || Pan-STARRS || — || align=right data-sort-value="0.80" | 800 m || 
|-id=061 bgcolor=#E9E9E9
| 487061 ||  || — || July 2, 2014 || Haleakala || Pan-STARRS || — || align=right | 2.4 km || 
|-id=062 bgcolor=#d6d6d6
| 487062 ||  || — || June 22, 2014 || Haleakala || Pan-STARRS || — || align=right | 3.0 km || 
|-id=063 bgcolor=#d6d6d6
| 487063 ||  || — || September 14, 2010 || Mount Lemmon || Mount Lemmon Survey || — || align=right | 2.8 km || 
|-id=064 bgcolor=#E9E9E9
| 487064 ||  || — || May 31, 2014 || Haleakala || Pan-STARRS || MAR || align=right data-sort-value="0.82" | 820 m || 
|-id=065 bgcolor=#E9E9E9
| 487065 ||  || — || June 19, 2010 || Mount Lemmon || Mount Lemmon Survey || — || align=right | 1.4 km || 
|-id=066 bgcolor=#E9E9E9
| 487066 ||  || — || May 23, 2010 || WISE || WISE || — || align=right | 1.6 km || 
|-id=067 bgcolor=#E9E9E9
| 487067 ||  || — || July 26, 2014 || Haleakala || Pan-STARRS || EUN || align=right | 1.3 km || 
|-id=068 bgcolor=#d6d6d6
| 487068 ||  || — || July 28, 2009 || Catalina || CSS || — || align=right | 2.4 km || 
|-id=069 bgcolor=#E9E9E9
| 487069 ||  || — || February 2, 2008 || Kitt Peak || Spacewatch || GEF || align=right | 1.2 km || 
|-id=070 bgcolor=#d6d6d6
| 487070 ||  || — || January 10, 2006 || Mount Lemmon || Mount Lemmon Survey || — || align=right | 2.4 km || 
|-id=071 bgcolor=#d6d6d6
| 487071 ||  || — || February 22, 2007 || Kitt Peak || Spacewatch || — || align=right | 2.5 km || 
|-id=072 bgcolor=#fefefe
| 487072 ||  || — || January 16, 2009 || Kitt Peak || Spacewatch || — || align=right data-sort-value="0.88" | 880 m || 
|-id=073 bgcolor=#d6d6d6
| 487073 ||  || — || July 7, 2014 || Haleakala || Pan-STARRS || EOS || align=right | 1.5 km || 
|-id=074 bgcolor=#d6d6d6
| 487074 ||  || — || January 30, 2011 || Haleakala || Pan-STARRS || — || align=right | 3.5 km || 
|-id=075 bgcolor=#d6d6d6
| 487075 ||  || — || April 21, 2012 || Haleakala || Pan-STARRS || — || align=right | 3.1 km || 
|-id=076 bgcolor=#E9E9E9
| 487076 ||  || — || July 26, 2014 || Haleakala || Pan-STARRS || — || align=right | 2.3 km || 
|-id=077 bgcolor=#d6d6d6
| 487077 ||  || — || November 24, 2011 || Haleakala || Pan-STARRS || BRA || align=right | 1.6 km || 
|-id=078 bgcolor=#d6d6d6
| 487078 ||  || — || July 27, 2014 || Haleakala || Pan-STARRS || — || align=right | 2.3 km || 
|-id=079 bgcolor=#d6d6d6
| 487079 ||  || — || June 27, 2014 || Haleakala || Pan-STARRS || — || align=right | 3.5 km || 
|-id=080 bgcolor=#fefefe
| 487080 ||  || — || April 9, 2010 || Kitt Peak || Spacewatch || — || align=right data-sort-value="0.93" | 930 m || 
|-id=081 bgcolor=#d6d6d6
| 487081 ||  || — || July 25, 2014 || Haleakala || Pan-STARRS || EOS || align=right | 1.4 km || 
|-id=082 bgcolor=#d6d6d6
| 487082 ||  || — || February 16, 2012 || Haleakala || Pan-STARRS || — || align=right | 2.9 km || 
|-id=083 bgcolor=#E9E9E9
| 487083 ||  || — || March 19, 2013 || Haleakala || Pan-STARRS || — || align=right | 1.2 km || 
|-id=084 bgcolor=#E9E9E9
| 487084 ||  || — || March 9, 2008 || Mount Lemmon || Mount Lemmon Survey || — || align=right | 1.7 km || 
|-id=085 bgcolor=#d6d6d6
| 487085 ||  || — || November 10, 2010 || Mount Lemmon || Mount Lemmon Survey || — || align=right | 2.1 km || 
|-id=086 bgcolor=#d6d6d6
| 487086 ||  || — || December 30, 2008 || Kitt Peak || Spacewatch || 3:2critical || align=right | 3.2 km || 
|-id=087 bgcolor=#d6d6d6
| 487087 ||  || — || December 29, 2005 || Kitt Peak || Spacewatch || — || align=right | 2.6 km || 
|-id=088 bgcolor=#d6d6d6
| 487088 ||  || — || January 18, 2012 || Kitt Peak || Spacewatch || — || align=right | 2.8 km || 
|-id=089 bgcolor=#E9E9E9
| 487089 ||  || — || September 16, 2010 || Kitt Peak || Spacewatch || — || align=right | 2.0 km || 
|-id=090 bgcolor=#E9E9E9
| 487090 ||  || — || June 2, 2014 || Mount Lemmon || Mount Lemmon Survey || — || align=right data-sort-value="0.94" | 940 m || 
|-id=091 bgcolor=#d6d6d6
| 487091 ||  || — || November 10, 2010 || Mount Lemmon || Mount Lemmon Survey || KOR || align=right | 1.0 km || 
|-id=092 bgcolor=#d6d6d6
| 487092 ||  || — || April 19, 2013 || Haleakala || Pan-STARRS || EOS || align=right | 2.0 km || 
|-id=093 bgcolor=#E9E9E9
| 487093 ||  || — || December 31, 2011 || Kitt Peak || Spacewatch || — || align=right | 2.3 km || 
|-id=094 bgcolor=#E9E9E9
| 487094 ||  || — || June 27, 2010 || WISE || WISE || — || align=right | 3.0 km || 
|-id=095 bgcolor=#d6d6d6
| 487095 ||  || — || July 27, 2014 || Haleakala || Pan-STARRS || — || align=right | 3.0 km || 
|-id=096 bgcolor=#fefefe
| 487096 ||  || — || October 31, 2007 || Mount Lemmon || Mount Lemmon Survey || — || align=right data-sort-value="0.85" | 850 m || 
|-id=097 bgcolor=#fefefe
| 487097 ||  || — || January 10, 2013 || Haleakala || Pan-STARRS || — || align=right data-sort-value="0.91" | 910 m || 
|-id=098 bgcolor=#fefefe
| 487098 ||  || — || February 1, 2006 || Mount Lemmon || Mount Lemmon Survey || — || align=right data-sort-value="0.67" | 670 m || 
|-id=099 bgcolor=#E9E9E9
| 487099 ||  || — || March 12, 2013 || Mount Lemmon || Mount Lemmon Survey || NEM || align=right | 2.2 km || 
|-id=100 bgcolor=#E9E9E9
| 487100 ||  || — || June 1, 2005 || Mount Lemmon || Mount Lemmon Survey || — || align=right | 1.2 km || 
|}

487101–487200 

|-bgcolor=#d6d6d6
| 487101 ||  || — || July 27, 2014 || Haleakala || Pan-STARRS || EOS || align=right | 1.5 km || 
|-id=102 bgcolor=#fefefe
| 487102 ||  || — || August 30, 2003 || Kitt Peak || Spacewatch || NYS || align=right data-sort-value="0.44" | 440 m || 
|-id=103 bgcolor=#fefefe
| 487103 ||  || — || January 31, 2006 || Kitt Peak || Spacewatch || NYS || align=right data-sort-value="0.54" | 540 m || 
|-id=104 bgcolor=#d6d6d6
| 487104 ||  || — || October 2, 2005 || Mount Lemmon || Mount Lemmon Survey || KOR || align=right | 1.1 km || 
|-id=105 bgcolor=#d6d6d6
| 487105 ||  || — || April 10, 2013 || Haleakala || Pan-STARRS || — || align=right | 2.0 km || 
|-id=106 bgcolor=#E9E9E9
| 487106 ||  || — || October 26, 2011 || Haleakala || Pan-STARRS || — || align=right | 1.3 km || 
|-id=107 bgcolor=#d6d6d6
| 487107 ||  || — || September 22, 2009 || Mount Lemmon || Mount Lemmon Survey || EOS || align=right | 1.9 km || 
|-id=108 bgcolor=#E9E9E9
| 487108 ||  || — || March 19, 2013 || Haleakala || Pan-STARRS || — || align=right | 1.8 km || 
|-id=109 bgcolor=#d6d6d6
| 487109 ||  || — || June 30, 2014 || Haleakala || Pan-STARRS || — || align=right | 2.7 km || 
|-id=110 bgcolor=#E9E9E9
| 487110 ||  || — || April 13, 2013 || Haleakala || Pan-STARRS || — || align=right | 1.7 km || 
|-id=111 bgcolor=#E9E9E9
| 487111 ||  || — || June 26, 2014 || Haleakala || Pan-STARRS || — || align=right data-sort-value="0.83" | 830 m || 
|-id=112 bgcolor=#E9E9E9
| 487112 ||  || — || September 10, 2010 || Kitt Peak || Spacewatch || — || align=right | 1.9 km || 
|-id=113 bgcolor=#E9E9E9
| 487113 ||  || — || June 27, 2014 || Haleakala || Pan-STARRS || — || align=right | 2.1 km || 
|-id=114 bgcolor=#d6d6d6
| 487114 ||  || — || August 16, 2009 || Kitt Peak || Spacewatch || EOS || align=right | 1.7 km || 
|-id=115 bgcolor=#d6d6d6
| 487115 ||  || — || October 31, 2010 || Mount Lemmon || Mount Lemmon Survey || — || align=right | 2.8 km || 
|-id=116 bgcolor=#d6d6d6
| 487116 ||  || — || June 29, 2014 || Haleakala || Pan-STARRS || BRA || align=right | 1.4 km || 
|-id=117 bgcolor=#d6d6d6
| 487117 ||  || — || September 15, 2009 || Kitt Peak || Spacewatch || (5651) || align=right | 2.4 km || 
|-id=118 bgcolor=#E9E9E9
| 487118 ||  || — || February 6, 2008 || Catalina || CSS || GEF || align=right | 1.3 km || 
|-id=119 bgcolor=#fefefe
| 487119 ||  || — || April 2, 2006 || Kitt Peak || Spacewatch || — || align=right data-sort-value="0.75" | 750 m || 
|-id=120 bgcolor=#E9E9E9
| 487120 ||  || — || June 27, 2014 || Haleakala || Pan-STARRS || — || align=right | 2.0 km || 
|-id=121 bgcolor=#E9E9E9
| 487121 ||  || — || July 3, 2014 || Haleakala || Pan-STARRS || — || align=right data-sort-value="0.82" | 820 m || 
|-id=122 bgcolor=#E9E9E9
| 487122 ||  || — || June 27, 2014 || Haleakala || Pan-STARRS || — || align=right | 1.4 km || 
|-id=123 bgcolor=#d6d6d6
| 487123 ||  || — || January 24, 2011 || Mount Lemmon || Mount Lemmon Survey || — || align=right | 2.5 km || 
|-id=124 bgcolor=#E9E9E9
| 487124 ||  || — || March 19, 2013 || Haleakala || Pan-STARRS || NEM || align=right | 2.3 km || 
|-id=125 bgcolor=#E9E9E9
| 487125 ||  || — || July 25, 2014 || Haleakala || Pan-STARRS || — || align=right data-sort-value="0.73" | 730 m || 
|-id=126 bgcolor=#E9E9E9
| 487126 ||  || — || November 3, 2011 || Mount Lemmon || Mount Lemmon Survey || — || align=right | 1.3 km || 
|-id=127 bgcolor=#d6d6d6
| 487127 ||  || — || February 20, 2012 || Haleakala || Pan-STARRS || — || align=right | 2.7 km || 
|-id=128 bgcolor=#d6d6d6
| 487128 ||  || — || February 27, 2012 || Haleakala || Pan-STARRS || — || align=right | 2.7 km || 
|-id=129 bgcolor=#d6d6d6
| 487129 ||  || — || June 28, 2014 || Haleakala || Pan-STARRS || — || align=right | 3.1 km || 
|-id=130 bgcolor=#d6d6d6
| 487130 ||  || — || January 2, 2011 || Mount Lemmon || Mount Lemmon Survey || critical || align=right | 2.4 km || 
|-id=131 bgcolor=#E9E9E9
| 487131 ||  || — || March 12, 2005 || Kitt Peak || Spacewatch || — || align=right data-sort-value="0.98" | 980 m || 
|-id=132 bgcolor=#d6d6d6
| 487132 ||  || — || December 2, 2010 || Kitt Peak || Spacewatch || — || align=right | 2.7 km || 
|-id=133 bgcolor=#fefefe
| 487133 ||  || — || July 27, 2014 || Haleakala || Pan-STARRS || — || align=right data-sort-value="0.72" | 720 m || 
|-id=134 bgcolor=#d6d6d6
| 487134 ||  || — || May 31, 2008 || Mount Lemmon || Mount Lemmon Survey || Tj (2.99) || align=right | 3.2 km || 
|-id=135 bgcolor=#E9E9E9
| 487135 ||  || — || October 26, 2011 || Haleakala || Pan-STARRS || — || align=right data-sort-value="0.72" | 720 m || 
|-id=136 bgcolor=#E9E9E9
| 487136 ||  || — || April 6, 2008 || Mount Lemmon || Mount Lemmon Survey || AGN || align=right | 1.1 km || 
|-id=137 bgcolor=#d6d6d6
| 487137 ||  || — || January 26, 2006 || Kitt Peak || Spacewatch || — || align=right | 2.9 km || 
|-id=138 bgcolor=#d6d6d6
| 487138 ||  || — || April 10, 2013 || Haleakala || Pan-STARRS || KOR || align=right | 1.1 km || 
|-id=139 bgcolor=#E9E9E9
| 487139 ||  || — || September 26, 2005 || Kitt Peak || Spacewatch || AGN || align=right | 1.1 km || 
|-id=140 bgcolor=#fefefe
| 487140 ||  || — || July 7, 2014 || Haleakala || Pan-STARRS || V || align=right data-sort-value="0.67" | 670 m || 
|-id=141 bgcolor=#d6d6d6
| 487141 ||  || — || December 5, 2007 || Mount Lemmon || Mount Lemmon Survey || SHU3:2critical || align=right | 4.8 km || 
|-id=142 bgcolor=#E9E9E9
| 487142 ||  || — || February 20, 2009 || Kitt Peak || Spacewatch || — || align=right data-sort-value="0.94" | 940 m || 
|-id=143 bgcolor=#d6d6d6
| 487143 ||  || — || January 18, 2012 || Mount Lemmon || Mount Lemmon Survey || — || align=right | 2.3 km || 
|-id=144 bgcolor=#d6d6d6
| 487144 ||  || — || January 23, 2006 || Kitt Peak || Spacewatch || — || align=right | 3.1 km || 
|-id=145 bgcolor=#d6d6d6
| 487145 ||  || — || June 30, 2014 || Haleakala || Pan-STARRS || — || align=right | 2.9 km || 
|-id=146 bgcolor=#d6d6d6
| 487146 ||  || — || April 13, 2013 || Haleakala || Pan-STARRS || — || align=right | 2.9 km || 
|-id=147 bgcolor=#d6d6d6
| 487147 ||  || — || July 27, 2014 || Haleakala || Pan-STARRS || — || align=right | 3.4 km || 
|-id=148 bgcolor=#d6d6d6
| 487148 ||  || — || January 10, 2011 || Kitt Peak || Spacewatch || — || align=right | 2.7 km || 
|-id=149 bgcolor=#E9E9E9
| 487149 ||  || — || June 27, 2014 || Haleakala || Pan-STARRS || AGN || align=right | 1.00 km || 
|-id=150 bgcolor=#d6d6d6
| 487150 ||  || — || July 27, 2014 || Haleakala || Pan-STARRS || — || align=right | 3.2 km || 
|-id=151 bgcolor=#fefefe
| 487151 ||  || — || September 23, 2011 || Haleakala || Pan-STARRS || — || align=right data-sort-value="0.86" | 860 m || 
|-id=152 bgcolor=#d6d6d6
| 487152 ||  || — || February 24, 2012 || Kitt Peak || Spacewatch || EOS || align=right | 1.8 km || 
|-id=153 bgcolor=#d6d6d6
| 487153 ||  || — || July 27, 2014 || Haleakala || Pan-STARRS || VER || align=right | 2.5 km || 
|-id=154 bgcolor=#d6d6d6
| 487154 ||  || — || February 12, 2010 || WISE || WISE || URS || align=right | 3.7 km || 
|-id=155 bgcolor=#d6d6d6
| 487155 ||  || — || October 30, 2009 || Mount Lemmon || Mount Lemmon Survey || — || align=right | 3.5 km || 
|-id=156 bgcolor=#d6d6d6
| 487156 ||  || — || April 5, 2014 || Haleakala || Pan-STARRS || — || align=right | 2.8 km || 
|-id=157 bgcolor=#d6d6d6
| 487157 ||  || — || July 29, 2014 || Haleakala || Pan-STARRS || — || align=right | 2.3 km || 
|-id=158 bgcolor=#d6d6d6
| 487158 ||  || — || July 25, 2014 || Haleakala || Pan-STARRS || — || align=right | 2.0 km || 
|-id=159 bgcolor=#d6d6d6
| 487159 ||  || — || February 28, 2012 || Haleakala || Pan-STARRS || — || align=right | 2.7 km || 
|-id=160 bgcolor=#d6d6d6
| 487160 ||  || — || February 17, 2007 || Kitt Peak || Spacewatch || EOS || align=right | 1.9 km || 
|-id=161 bgcolor=#E9E9E9
| 487161 ||  || — || March 18, 2013 || Kitt Peak || Spacewatch || — || align=right | 2.1 km || 
|-id=162 bgcolor=#d6d6d6
| 487162 ||  || — || June 29, 2014 || Haleakala || Pan-STARRS || — || align=right | 2.7 km || 
|-id=163 bgcolor=#d6d6d6
| 487163 ||  || — || October 3, 1999 || Kitt Peak || Spacewatch || — || align=right | 2.3 km || 
|-id=164 bgcolor=#d6d6d6
| 487164 ||  || — || September 15, 2009 || Kitt Peak || Spacewatch || — || align=right | 2.2 km || 
|-id=165 bgcolor=#d6d6d6
| 487165 ||  || — || December 25, 2005 || Kitt Peak || Spacewatch || TEL || align=right | 1.2 km || 
|-id=166 bgcolor=#E9E9E9
| 487166 ||  || — || March 16, 2013 || Kitt Peak || Spacewatch || — || align=right | 2.0 km || 
|-id=167 bgcolor=#d6d6d6
| 487167 ||  || — || April 19, 2013 || Haleakala || Pan-STARRS || — || align=right | 3.1 km || 
|-id=168 bgcolor=#E9E9E9
| 487168 ||  || — || December 19, 2007 || Mount Lemmon || Mount Lemmon Survey || — || align=right | 2.3 km || 
|-id=169 bgcolor=#d6d6d6
| 487169 ||  || — || January 22, 2012 || Haleakala || Pan-STARRS || — || align=right | 3.4 km || 
|-id=170 bgcolor=#d6d6d6
| 487170 ||  || — || June 29, 2014 || Haleakala || Pan-STARRS || — || align=right | 2.6 km || 
|-id=171 bgcolor=#fefefe
| 487171 ||  || — || September 24, 2011 || Haleakala || Pan-STARRS || — || align=right | 1.1 km || 
|-id=172 bgcolor=#fefefe
| 487172 ||  || — || April 22, 2007 || Mount Lemmon || Mount Lemmon Survey || — || align=right data-sort-value="0.70" | 700 m || 
|-id=173 bgcolor=#d6d6d6
| 487173 ||  || — || December 14, 2010 || Mount Lemmon || Mount Lemmon Survey || TEL || align=right | 1.1 km || 
|-id=174 bgcolor=#d6d6d6
| 487174 ||  || — || August 27, 2009 || Kitt Peak || Spacewatch || EOS || align=right | 1.7 km || 
|-id=175 bgcolor=#d6d6d6
| 487175 ||  || — || February 24, 2012 || Kitt Peak || Spacewatch || — || align=right | 3.2 km || 
|-id=176 bgcolor=#E9E9E9
| 487176 ||  || — || February 9, 2008 || Kitt Peak || Spacewatch || — || align=right | 2.2 km || 
|-id=177 bgcolor=#d6d6d6
| 487177 ||  || — || April 1, 2008 || Mount Lemmon || Mount Lemmon Survey || KOR || align=right | 1.2 km || 
|-id=178 bgcolor=#d6d6d6
| 487178 ||  || — || April 10, 2013 || Haleakala || Pan-STARRS || KOR || align=right | 1.1 km || 
|-id=179 bgcolor=#fefefe
| 487179 ||  || — || October 26, 2011 || Haleakala || Pan-STARRS || — || align=right data-sort-value="0.86" | 860 m || 
|-id=180 bgcolor=#d6d6d6
| 487180 ||  || — || January 29, 2012 || Kitt Peak || Spacewatch || — || align=right | 3.5 km || 
|-id=181 bgcolor=#d6d6d6
| 487181 ||  || — || July 25, 2014 || Haleakala || Pan-STARRS || — || align=right | 3.2 km || 
|-id=182 bgcolor=#d6d6d6
| 487182 ||  || — || August 20, 2009 || La Sagra || OAM Obs. || — || align=right | 2.9 km || 
|-id=183 bgcolor=#d6d6d6
| 487183 ||  || — || April 16, 2013 || Haleakala || Pan-STARRS || — || align=right | 3.4 km || 
|-id=184 bgcolor=#d6d6d6
| 487184 ||  || — || July 30, 2014 || Haleakala || Pan-STARRS || — || align=right | 3.0 km || 
|-id=185 bgcolor=#d6d6d6
| 487185 ||  || — || June 27, 2014 || Haleakala || Pan-STARRS || — || align=right | 2.1 km || 
|-id=186 bgcolor=#d6d6d6
| 487186 ||  || — || June 7, 2013 || Haleakala || Pan-STARRS || — || align=right | 2.8 km || 
|-id=187 bgcolor=#d6d6d6
| 487187 ||  || — || February 4, 2012 || Haleakala || Pan-STARRS || — || align=right | 3.1 km || 
|-id=188 bgcolor=#E9E9E9
| 487188 ||  || — || December 19, 2007 || Mount Lemmon || Mount Lemmon Survey || MAR || align=right data-sort-value="0.99" | 990 m || 
|-id=189 bgcolor=#d6d6d6
| 487189 ||  || — || June 27, 2014 || Haleakala || Pan-STARRS || — || align=right | 2.1 km || 
|-id=190 bgcolor=#E9E9E9
| 487190 ||  || — || February 17, 2005 || La Silla || A. Boattini || — || align=right data-sort-value="0.80" | 800 m || 
|-id=191 bgcolor=#d6d6d6
| 487191 ||  || — || September 16, 2009 || Mount Lemmon || Mount Lemmon Survey || EOS || align=right | 1.7 km || 
|-id=192 bgcolor=#E9E9E9
| 487192 ||  || — || March 19, 2009 || Kitt Peak || Spacewatch || — || align=right | 1.2 km || 
|-id=193 bgcolor=#fefefe
| 487193 ||  || — || October 26, 2011 || Haleakala || Pan-STARRS || — || align=right data-sort-value="0.94" | 940 m || 
|-id=194 bgcolor=#d6d6d6
| 487194 ||  || — || July 2, 2014 || Haleakala || Pan-STARRS || — || align=right | 2.3 km || 
|-id=195 bgcolor=#E9E9E9
| 487195 ||  || — || October 23, 2011 || Haleakala || Pan-STARRS || — || align=right | 1.1 km || 
|-id=196 bgcolor=#d6d6d6
| 487196 ||  || — || January 27, 2006 || Kitt Peak || Spacewatch || — || align=right | 2.2 km || 
|-id=197 bgcolor=#d6d6d6
| 487197 ||  || — || July 28, 2014 || Haleakala || Pan-STARRS || EOScritical || align=right | 1.6 km || 
|-id=198 bgcolor=#E9E9E9
| 487198 ||  || — || March 16, 2013 || Kitt Peak || Spacewatch || — || align=right | 1.8 km || 
|-id=199 bgcolor=#d6d6d6
| 487199 ||  || — || February 28, 2012 || Haleakala || Pan-STARRS || — || align=right | 3.0 km || 
|-id=200 bgcolor=#E9E9E9
| 487200 ||  || — || August 18, 2006 || Kitt Peak || Spacewatch || — || align=right | 1.4 km || 
|}

487201–487300 

|-bgcolor=#d6d6d6
| 487201 ||  || — || December 29, 2005 || Kitt Peak || Spacewatch || — || align=right | 2.5 km || 
|-id=202 bgcolor=#d6d6d6
| 487202 ||  || — || April 17, 2013 || Haleakala || Pan-STARRS || — || align=right | 2.8 km || 
|-id=203 bgcolor=#d6d6d6
| 487203 ||  || — || June 27, 2014 || Haleakala || Pan-STARRS || EOS || align=right | 1.6 km || 
|-id=204 bgcolor=#d6d6d6
| 487204 ||  || — || July 25, 2014 || Haleakala || Pan-STARRS || EOS || align=right | 1.9 km || 
|-id=205 bgcolor=#d6d6d6
| 487205 ||  || — || July 25, 2014 || Haleakala || Pan-STARRS || — || align=right | 1.8 km || 
|-id=206 bgcolor=#d6d6d6
| 487206 ||  || — || January 25, 2006 || Kitt Peak || Spacewatch || EOS || align=right | 1.8 km || 
|-id=207 bgcolor=#d6d6d6
| 487207 ||  || — || February 25, 2012 || Mount Lemmon || Mount Lemmon Survey || EOS || align=right | 1.9 km || 
|-id=208 bgcolor=#E9E9E9
| 487208 ||  || — || June 5, 2014 || Haleakala || Pan-STARRS || — || align=right | 1.0 km || 
|-id=209 bgcolor=#d6d6d6
| 487209 ||  || — || February 20, 2012 || Haleakala || Pan-STARRS || EOS || align=right | 1.9 km || 
|-id=210 bgcolor=#d6d6d6
| 487210 ||  || — || June 29, 2014 || Haleakala || Pan-STARRS || VER || align=right | 2.7 km || 
|-id=211 bgcolor=#E9E9E9
| 487211 ||  || — || August 31, 2005 || Kitt Peak || Spacewatch || — || align=right | 2.1 km || 
|-id=212 bgcolor=#E9E9E9
| 487212 ||  || — || April 1, 2013 || Kitt Peak || Spacewatch || — || align=right | 1.8 km || 
|-id=213 bgcolor=#E9E9E9
| 487213 ||  || — || February 17, 2013 || Kitt Peak || Spacewatch || — || align=right | 1.3 km || 
|-id=214 bgcolor=#d6d6d6
| 487214 ||  || — || July 4, 2014 || Haleakala || Pan-STARRS || — || align=right | 2.5 km || 
|-id=215 bgcolor=#d6d6d6
| 487215 ||  || — || February 28, 2012 || Haleakala || Pan-STARRS || — || align=right | 3.4 km || 
|-id=216 bgcolor=#d6d6d6
| 487216 ||  || — || November 14, 2010 || Mount Lemmon || Mount Lemmon Survey || EOS || align=right | 1.8 km || 
|-id=217 bgcolor=#d6d6d6
| 487217 ||  || — || December 4, 2005 || Kitt Peak || Spacewatch || — || align=right | 3.1 km || 
|-id=218 bgcolor=#d6d6d6
| 487218 ||  || — || August 29, 2009 || La Sagra || OAM Obs. || — || align=right | 2.9 km || 
|-id=219 bgcolor=#E9E9E9
| 487219 ||  || — || October 20, 2006 || Mount Lemmon || Mount Lemmon Survey || — || align=right | 1.4 km || 
|-id=220 bgcolor=#d6d6d6
| 487220 ||  || — || March 15, 2012 || Mount Lemmon || Mount Lemmon Survey || — || align=right | 2.5 km || 
|-id=221 bgcolor=#E9E9E9
| 487221 ||  || — || February 20, 2009 || Mount Lemmon || Mount Lemmon Survey || — || align=right data-sort-value="0.79" | 790 m || 
|-id=222 bgcolor=#d6d6d6
| 487222 ||  || — || January 20, 2010 || WISE || WISE || — || align=right | 3.1 km || 
|-id=223 bgcolor=#d6d6d6
| 487223 ||  || — || December 15, 2004 || Kitt Peak || Spacewatch || — || align=right | 3.3 km || 
|-id=224 bgcolor=#E9E9E9
| 487224 ||  || — || March 21, 2012 || Haleakala || Pan-STARRS || — || align=right | 1.7 km || 
|-id=225 bgcolor=#E9E9E9
| 487225 ||  || — || March 16, 2009 || Kitt Peak || Spacewatch || — || align=right | 1.1 km || 
|-id=226 bgcolor=#E9E9E9
| 487226 ||  || — || March 6, 2013 || Haleakala || Pan-STARRS || — || align=right | 1.0 km || 
|-id=227 bgcolor=#E9E9E9
| 487227 ||  || — || February 19, 2009 || Kitt Peak || Spacewatch || — || align=right data-sort-value="0.83" | 830 m || 
|-id=228 bgcolor=#d6d6d6
| 487228 ||  || — || July 3, 2014 || Haleakala || Pan-STARRS || — || align=right | 2.4 km || 
|-id=229 bgcolor=#d6d6d6
| 487229 ||  || — || January 27, 2012 || Mount Lemmon || Mount Lemmon Survey || KOR || align=right | 1.1 km || 
|-id=230 bgcolor=#d6d6d6
| 487230 ||  || — || June 2, 2014 || Haleakala || Pan-STARRS || — || align=right | 2.7 km || 
|-id=231 bgcolor=#E9E9E9
| 487231 ||  || — || June 3, 2014 || Haleakala || Pan-STARRS || EUN || align=right | 1.0 km || 
|-id=232 bgcolor=#E9E9E9
| 487232 ||  || — || September 30, 2010 || Mount Lemmon || Mount Lemmon Survey || — || align=right | 1.7 km || 
|-id=233 bgcolor=#d6d6d6
| 487233 ||  || — || January 21, 2012 || Haleakala || Pan-STARRS || — || align=right | 4.3 km || 
|-id=234 bgcolor=#E9E9E9
| 487234 ||  || — || February 12, 2008 || Kitt Peak || Spacewatch || — || align=right | 1.8 km || 
|-id=235 bgcolor=#d6d6d6
| 487235 ||  || — || February 16, 2012 || Haleakala || Pan-STARRS || — || align=right | 2.5 km || 
|-id=236 bgcolor=#d6d6d6
| 487236 ||  || — || February 13, 2010 || WISE || WISE || SYL7:4 || align=right | 3.3 km || 
|-id=237 bgcolor=#d6d6d6
| 487237 ||  || — || August 3, 2014 || Haleakala || Pan-STARRS || EOS || align=right | 2.1 km || 
|-id=238 bgcolor=#d6d6d6
| 487238 ||  || — || June 26, 2014 || Haleakala || Pan-STARRS || BRA || align=right | 1.5 km || 
|-id=239 bgcolor=#d6d6d6
| 487239 ||  || — || January 28, 2011 || Mount Lemmon || Mount Lemmon Survey || — || align=right | 2.6 km || 
|-id=240 bgcolor=#fefefe
| 487240 ||  || — || March 26, 2006 || Kitt Peak || Spacewatch || — || align=right data-sort-value="0.69" | 690 m || 
|-id=241 bgcolor=#d6d6d6
| 487241 ||  || — || June 3, 2014 || Haleakala || Pan-STARRS || — || align=right | 3.5 km || 
|-id=242 bgcolor=#d6d6d6
| 487242 ||  || — || February 2, 2006 || Mount Lemmon || Mount Lemmon Survey || — || align=right | 2.7 km || 
|-id=243 bgcolor=#d6d6d6
| 487243 ||  || — || February 27, 2012 || Haleakala || Pan-STARRS || — || align=right | 2.5 km || 
|-id=244 bgcolor=#d6d6d6
| 487244 ||  || — || January 27, 2012 || Kitt Peak || Spacewatch || KOR || align=right | 1.2 km || 
|-id=245 bgcolor=#E9E9E9
| 487245 ||  || — || October 19, 2006 || Kitt Peak || Spacewatch || — || align=right data-sort-value="0.99" | 990 m || 
|-id=246 bgcolor=#d6d6d6
| 487246 ||  || — || April 7, 2013 || Kitt Peak || Spacewatch || EOS || align=right | 1.5 km || 
|-id=247 bgcolor=#d6d6d6
| 487247 ||  || — || June 23, 2014 || Mount Lemmon || Mount Lemmon Survey || — || align=right | 3.2 km || 
|-id=248 bgcolor=#d6d6d6
| 487248 ||  || — || November 16, 2010 || Mount Lemmon || Mount Lemmon Survey || — || align=right | 2.4 km || 
|-id=249 bgcolor=#d6d6d6
| 487249 ||  || — || March 16, 2012 || Mount Lemmon || Mount Lemmon Survey || — || align=right | 3.0 km || 
|-id=250 bgcolor=#E9E9E9
| 487250 ||  || — || July 25, 2014 || Haleakala || Pan-STARRS || — || align=right | 1.8 km || 
|-id=251 bgcolor=#E9E9E9
| 487251 ||  || — || October 17, 2010 || Mount Lemmon || Mount Lemmon Survey || — || align=right | 2.4 km || 
|-id=252 bgcolor=#d6d6d6
| 487252 ||  || — || February 1, 2012 || Mount Lemmon || Mount Lemmon Survey || — || align=right | 3.5 km || 
|-id=253 bgcolor=#d6d6d6
| 487253 ||  || — || May 15, 2013 || Haleakala || Pan-STARRS || — || align=right | 2.6 km || 
|-id=254 bgcolor=#d6d6d6
| 487254 ||  || — || August 17, 2009 || Kitt Peak || Spacewatch || EOS || align=right | 1.9 km || 
|-id=255 bgcolor=#d6d6d6
| 487255 ||  || — || October 27, 2009 || Mount Lemmon || Mount Lemmon Survey || — || align=right | 3.2 km || 
|-id=256 bgcolor=#E9E9E9
| 487256 ||  || — || March 26, 2008 || Mount Lemmon || Mount Lemmon Survey || — || align=right | 1.8 km || 
|-id=257 bgcolor=#d6d6d6
| 487257 ||  || — || December 22, 2005 || Kitt Peak || Spacewatch || EMA || align=right | 3.7 km || 
|-id=258 bgcolor=#E9E9E9
| 487258 ||  || — || January 26, 2012 || Haleakala || Pan-STARRS || — || align=right | 2.8 km || 
|-id=259 bgcolor=#d6d6d6
| 487259 ||  || — || September 18, 2009 || Mount Lemmon || Mount Lemmon Survey || — || align=right | 2.5 km || 
|-id=260 bgcolor=#E9E9E9
| 487260 ||  || — || September 15, 2006 || Kitt Peak || Spacewatch || EUN || align=right data-sort-value="0.97" | 970 m || 
|-id=261 bgcolor=#d6d6d6
| 487261 ||  || — || July 25, 2014 || Haleakala || Pan-STARRS || — || align=right | 2.5 km || 
|-id=262 bgcolor=#d6d6d6
| 487262 ||  || — || August 11, 2008 || La Sagra || OAM Obs. || — || align=right | 3.7 km || 
|-id=263 bgcolor=#d6d6d6
| 487263 ||  || — || September 27, 2009 || Mount Lemmon || Mount Lemmon Survey || EOS || align=right | 1.7 km || 
|-id=264 bgcolor=#d6d6d6
| 487264 ||  || — || January 22, 2006 || Mount Lemmon || Mount Lemmon Survey || — || align=right | 3.1 km || 
|-id=265 bgcolor=#d6d6d6
| 487265 ||  || — || January 23, 2006 || Kitt Peak || Spacewatch || EOS || align=right | 2.2 km || 
|-id=266 bgcolor=#d6d6d6
| 487266 ||  || — || September 16, 2009 || Mount Lemmon || Mount Lemmon Survey || EOS || align=right | 1.5 km || 
|-id=267 bgcolor=#d6d6d6
| 487267 ||  || — || November 10, 2010 || Mount Lemmon || Mount Lemmon Survey || — || align=right | 3.5 km || 
|-id=268 bgcolor=#E9E9E9
| 487268 ||  || — || August 4, 2014 || Haleakala || Pan-STARRS || — || align=right | 2.7 km || 
|-id=269 bgcolor=#d6d6d6
| 487269 ||  || — || August 4, 2014 || Haleakala || Pan-STARRS || — || align=right | 3.3 km || 
|-id=270 bgcolor=#d6d6d6
| 487270 ||  || — || February 6, 2010 || WISE || WISE || — || align=right | 4.0 km || 
|-id=271 bgcolor=#d6d6d6
| 487271 ||  || — || February 16, 2012 || Haleakala || Pan-STARRS || — || align=right | 3.1 km || 
|-id=272 bgcolor=#d6d6d6
| 487272 ||  || — || December 15, 2009 || Catalina || CSS || — || align=right | 4.1 km || 
|-id=273 bgcolor=#fefefe
| 487273 ||  || — || June 19, 2010 || Mount Lemmon || Mount Lemmon Survey || — || align=right data-sort-value="0.82" | 820 m || 
|-id=274 bgcolor=#d6d6d6
| 487274 ||  || — || July 3, 2014 || Haleakala || Pan-STARRS || — || align=right | 2.3 km || 
|-id=275 bgcolor=#d6d6d6
| 487275 ||  || — || June 5, 2014 || Haleakala || Pan-STARRS || — || align=right | 2.9 km || 
|-id=276 bgcolor=#E9E9E9
| 487276 ||  || — || January 3, 2012 || Mount Lemmon || Mount Lemmon Survey || — || align=right | 2.7 km || 
|-id=277 bgcolor=#E9E9E9
| 487277 ||  || — || February 17, 2004 || Kitt Peak || Spacewatch || — || align=right | 1.2 km || 
|-id=278 bgcolor=#E9E9E9
| 487278 ||  || — || February 3, 2012 || Haleakala || Pan-STARRS || — || align=right | 2.1 km || 
|-id=279 bgcolor=#d6d6d6
| 487279 ||  || — || July 28, 2014 || Haleakala || Pan-STARRS || EOS || align=right | 1.6 km || 
|-id=280 bgcolor=#E9E9E9
| 487280 ||  || — || September 11, 2001 || Socorro || LINEAR || — || align=right | 2.2 km || 
|-id=281 bgcolor=#E9E9E9
| 487281 ||  || — || February 28, 2008 || Kitt Peak || Spacewatch || — || align=right | 2.3 km || 
|-id=282 bgcolor=#E9E9E9
| 487282 ||  || — || June 3, 2014 || Haleakala || Pan-STARRS || — || align=right | 1.3 km || 
|-id=283 bgcolor=#d6d6d6
| 487283 ||  || — || March 15, 2012 || Mount Lemmon || Mount Lemmon Survey || — || align=right | 2.3 km || 
|-id=284 bgcolor=#d6d6d6
| 487284 ||  || — || January 15, 2010 || WISE || WISE || — || align=right | 4.2 km || 
|-id=285 bgcolor=#d6d6d6
| 487285 ||  || — || July 26, 1995 || Kitt Peak || Spacewatch || 7:4 || align=right | 3.0 km || 
|-id=286 bgcolor=#d6d6d6
| 487286 ||  || — || January 28, 2011 || Mount Lemmon || Mount Lemmon Survey || 7:4 || align=right | 2.8 km || 
|-id=287 bgcolor=#E9E9E9
| 487287 ||  || — || September 15, 2006 || Kitt Peak || Spacewatch || — || align=right data-sort-value="0.74" | 740 m || 
|-id=288 bgcolor=#fefefe
| 487288 ||  || — || February 3, 2013 || Haleakala || Pan-STARRS || NYS || align=right data-sort-value="0.68" | 680 m || 
|-id=289 bgcolor=#d6d6d6
| 487289 ||  || — || July 2, 2014 || Haleakala || Pan-STARRS || — || align=right | 2.5 km || 
|-id=290 bgcolor=#d6d6d6
| 487290 ||  || — || August 29, 2009 || Kitt Peak || Spacewatch || — || align=right | 2.4 km || 
|-id=291 bgcolor=#d6d6d6
| 487291 ||  || — || November 5, 2010 || Mount Lemmon || Mount Lemmon Survey || — || align=right | 2.9 km || 
|-id=292 bgcolor=#d6d6d6
| 487292 ||  || — || January 20, 2012 || Haleakala || Pan-STARRS || — || align=right | 3.9 km || 
|-id=293 bgcolor=#E9E9E9
| 487293 ||  || — || October 11, 2010 || Mount Lemmon || Mount Lemmon Survey || — || align=right | 2.1 km || 
|-id=294 bgcolor=#d6d6d6
| 487294 ||  || — || April 16, 2013 || Haleakala || Pan-STARRS || EOS || align=right | 1.7 km || 
|-id=295 bgcolor=#E9E9E9
| 487295 ||  || — || February 12, 2004 || Kitt Peak || Spacewatch || JUN || align=right data-sort-value="0.97" | 970 m || 
|-id=296 bgcolor=#d6d6d6
| 487296 ||  || — || July 2, 2014 || Haleakala || Pan-STARRS || — || align=right | 3.6 km || 
|-id=297 bgcolor=#fefefe
| 487297 ||  || — || February 1, 2013 || Mount Lemmon || Mount Lemmon Survey || — || align=right data-sort-value="0.78" | 780 m || 
|-id=298 bgcolor=#fefefe
| 487298 ||  || — || October 1, 2003 || Kitt Peak || Spacewatch || — || align=right data-sort-value="0.82" | 820 m || 
|-id=299 bgcolor=#d6d6d6
| 487299 ||  || — || April 16, 2013 || Haleakala || Pan-STARRS || — || align=right | 2.2 km || 
|-id=300 bgcolor=#d6d6d6
| 487300 ||  || — || January 19, 2012 || Kitt Peak || Spacewatch || — || align=right | 2.6 km || 
|}

487301–487400 

|-bgcolor=#d6d6d6
| 487301 ||  || — || June 27, 2014 || Haleakala || Pan-STARRS || BRA || align=right | 1.5 km || 
|-id=302 bgcolor=#E9E9E9
| 487302 ||  || — || June 27, 2014 || Haleakala || Pan-STARRS || — || align=right data-sort-value="0.92" | 920 m || 
|-id=303 bgcolor=#d6d6d6
| 487303 ||  || — || August 27, 2009 || Kitt Peak || Spacewatch || — || align=right | 2.1 km || 
|-id=304 bgcolor=#d6d6d6
| 487304 ||  || — || December 5, 2010 || Kitt Peak || Spacewatch || — || align=right | 3.2 km || 
|-id=305 bgcolor=#E9E9E9
| 487305 ||  || — || August 20, 2014 || Haleakala || Pan-STARRS || — || align=right | 1.8 km || 
|-id=306 bgcolor=#d6d6d6
| 487306 ||  || — || June 3, 2014 || Haleakala || Pan-STARRS || — || align=right | 2.8 km || 
|-id=307 bgcolor=#d6d6d6
| 487307 ||  || — || June 3, 2014 || Haleakala || Pan-STARRS || — || align=right | 2.7 km || 
|-id=308 bgcolor=#d6d6d6
| 487308 ||  || — || March 16, 2012 || Haleakala || Pan-STARRS || — || align=right | 3.0 km || 
|-id=309 bgcolor=#E9E9E9
| 487309 ||  || — || June 3, 2014 || Haleakala || Pan-STARRS || GEF || align=right | 1.1 km || 
|-id=310 bgcolor=#E9E9E9
| 487310 ||  || — || October 9, 2010 || Mount Lemmon || Mount Lemmon Survey || — || align=right | 1.8 km || 
|-id=311 bgcolor=#d6d6d6
| 487311 ||  || — || October 14, 2004 || Kitt Peak || Spacewatch || — || align=right | 2.4 km || 
|-id=312 bgcolor=#d6d6d6
| 487312 ||  || — || May 15, 2013 || Haleakala || Pan-STARRS || EOS || align=right | 1.4 km || 
|-id=313 bgcolor=#d6d6d6
| 487313 ||  || — || April 25, 2011 || Haleakala || Pan-STARRS || — || align=right | 3.6 km || 
|-id=314 bgcolor=#d6d6d6
| 487314 ||  || — || February 27, 2012 || Haleakala || Pan-STARRS || EOS || align=right | 1.9 km || 
|-id=315 bgcolor=#d6d6d6
| 487315 ||  || — || July 28, 2014 || Haleakala || Pan-STARRS || — || align=right | 2.0 km || 
|-id=316 bgcolor=#d6d6d6
| 487316 ||  || — || October 28, 2005 || Mount Lemmon || Mount Lemmon Survey || KOR || align=right | 1.2 km || 
|-id=317 bgcolor=#E9E9E9
| 487317 ||  || — || February 1, 2012 || Mount Lemmon || Mount Lemmon Survey || — || align=right | 2.1 km || 
|-id=318 bgcolor=#d6d6d6
| 487318 ||  || — || February 28, 2012 || Haleakala || Pan-STARRS || — || align=right | 2.3 km || 
|-id=319 bgcolor=#d6d6d6
| 487319 ||  || — || March 13, 2012 || Mount Lemmon || Mount Lemmon Survey || EOS || align=right | 1.7 km || 
|-id=320 bgcolor=#d6d6d6
| 487320 ||  || — || February 21, 2012 || Kitt Peak || Spacewatch || EOS || align=right | 1.9 km || 
|-id=321 bgcolor=#d6d6d6
| 487321 ||  || — || September 14, 2009 || Kitt Peak || Spacewatch || — || align=right | 2.2 km || 
|-id=322 bgcolor=#E9E9E9
| 487322 ||  || — || October 6, 2005 || Kitt Peak || Spacewatch || — || align=right | 1.8 km || 
|-id=323 bgcolor=#E9E9E9
| 487323 ||  || — || November 5, 2010 || Mount Lemmon || Mount Lemmon Survey || — || align=right | 2.2 km || 
|-id=324 bgcolor=#d6d6d6
| 487324 ||  || — || January 26, 2006 || Mount Lemmon || Mount Lemmon Survey || — || align=right | 2.5 km || 
|-id=325 bgcolor=#E9E9E9
| 487325 ||  || — || June 24, 2014 || Haleakala || Pan-STARRS || 526 || align=right | 3.0 km || 
|-id=326 bgcolor=#d6d6d6
| 487326 ||  || — || May 8, 2013 || Haleakala || Pan-STARRS || — || align=right | 3.1 km || 
|-id=327 bgcolor=#d6d6d6
| 487327 ||  || — || February 24, 2006 || Kitt Peak || Spacewatch || — || align=right | 2.8 km || 
|-id=328 bgcolor=#d6d6d6
| 487328 ||  || — || September 10, 2004 || Kitt Peak || Spacewatch || EOS || align=right | 1.5 km || 
|-id=329 bgcolor=#d6d6d6
| 487329 ||  || — || February 10, 2007 || Mount Lemmon || Mount Lemmon Survey || — || align=right | 2.3 km || 
|-id=330 bgcolor=#E9E9E9
| 487330 ||  || — || February 3, 2012 || Haleakala || Pan-STARRS || — || align=right | 2.1 km || 
|-id=331 bgcolor=#d6d6d6
| 487331 ||  || — || September 23, 2008 || Mount Lemmon || Mount Lemmon Survey || 7:4 || align=right | 2.9 km || 
|-id=332 bgcolor=#d6d6d6
| 487332 ||  || — || February 24, 2006 || Kitt Peak || Spacewatch || — || align=right | 2.4 km || 
|-id=333 bgcolor=#d6d6d6
| 487333 ||  || — || August 30, 2009 || Kitt Peak || Spacewatch || — || align=right | 3.2 km || 
|-id=334 bgcolor=#d6d6d6
| 487334 ||  || — || February 26, 2012 || Haleakala || Pan-STARRS || EOS || align=right | 1.9 km || 
|-id=335 bgcolor=#E9E9E9
| 487335 ||  || — || March 16, 2013 || Kitt Peak || Spacewatch || EUN || align=right | 1.2 km || 
|-id=336 bgcolor=#d6d6d6
| 487336 ||  || — || April 19, 2013 || Haleakala || Pan-STARRS || critical || align=right | 2.5 km || 
|-id=337 bgcolor=#d6d6d6
| 487337 ||  || — || September 16, 2009 || Kitt Peak || Spacewatch || — || align=right | 3.4 km || 
|-id=338 bgcolor=#d6d6d6
| 487338 ||  || — || December 29, 2011 || Mount Lemmon || Mount Lemmon Survey || BRA || align=right | 1.6 km || 
|-id=339 bgcolor=#d6d6d6
| 487339 ||  || — || March 16, 2012 || Mount Lemmon || Mount Lemmon Survey || — || align=right | 3.1 km || 
|-id=340 bgcolor=#E9E9E9
| 487340 ||  || — || May 27, 2009 || Mount Lemmon || Mount Lemmon Survey || critical || align=right | 1.3 km || 
|-id=341 bgcolor=#d6d6d6
| 487341 ||  || — || June 24, 2014 || Haleakala || Pan-STARRS || — || align=right | 3.1 km || 
|-id=342 bgcolor=#d6d6d6
| 487342 ||  || — || January 26, 2006 || Mount Lemmon || Mount Lemmon Survey || EOS || align=right | 1.9 km || 
|-id=343 bgcolor=#d6d6d6
| 487343 ||  || — || January 14, 2012 || Catalina || CSS || BRA || align=right | 1.8 km || 
|-id=344 bgcolor=#d6d6d6
| 487344 ||  || — || August 22, 2014 || Haleakala || Pan-STARRS || — || align=right | 2.7 km || 
|-id=345 bgcolor=#E9E9E9
| 487345 ||  || — || September 15, 2010 || Mount Lemmon || Mount Lemmon Survey || EUN || align=right | 1.0 km || 
|-id=346 bgcolor=#d6d6d6
| 487346 ||  || — || June 24, 2014 || Haleakala || Pan-STARRS || — || align=right | 2.7 km || 
|-id=347 bgcolor=#d6d6d6
| 487347 ||  || — || February 23, 2012 || Mount Lemmon || Mount Lemmon Survey || — || align=right | 3.1 km || 
|-id=348 bgcolor=#d6d6d6
| 487348 ||  || — || February 13, 2012 || Haleakala || Pan-STARRS || — || align=right | 2.6 km || 
|-id=349 bgcolor=#d6d6d6
| 487349 ||  || — || September 19, 2003 || Kitt Peak || Spacewatch || — || align=right | 2.5 km || 
|-id=350 bgcolor=#E9E9E9
| 487350 ||  || — || October 29, 2010 || Mount Lemmon || Mount Lemmon Survey || — || align=right | 1.8 km || 
|-id=351 bgcolor=#d6d6d6
| 487351 ||  || — || February 27, 2012 || Haleakala || Pan-STARRS || EOS || align=right | 1.5 km || 
|-id=352 bgcolor=#E9E9E9
| 487352 ||  || — || April 10, 2013 || Haleakala || Pan-STARRS || — || align=right | 1.7 km || 
|-id=353 bgcolor=#d6d6d6
| 487353 ||  || — || January 9, 2006 || Mount Lemmon || Mount Lemmon Survey || — || align=right | 3.2 km || 
|-id=354 bgcolor=#d6d6d6
| 487354 ||  || — || January 19, 2012 || Haleakala || Pan-STARRS || — || align=right | 3.0 km || 
|-id=355 bgcolor=#d6d6d6
| 487355 ||  || — || August 18, 2009 || Kitt Peak || Spacewatch || — || align=right | 2.6 km || 
|-id=356 bgcolor=#d6d6d6
| 487356 ||  || — || February 27, 2012 || Haleakala || Pan-STARRS || EOS || align=right | 2.1 km || 
|-id=357 bgcolor=#E9E9E9
| 487357 ||  || — || September 10, 2010 || Kitt Peak || Spacewatch || — || align=right | 1.2 km || 
|-id=358 bgcolor=#d6d6d6
| 487358 ||  || — || April 1, 2012 || Haleakala || Pan-STARRS || — || align=right | 4.7 km || 
|-id=359 bgcolor=#d6d6d6
| 487359 ||  || — || January 29, 2010 || WISE || WISE || — || align=right | 2.9 km || 
|-id=360 bgcolor=#d6d6d6
| 487360 ||  || — || October 23, 2003 || Kitt Peak || Spacewatch || — || align=right | 3.7 km || 
|-id=361 bgcolor=#d6d6d6
| 487361 ||  || — || July 7, 2014 || Haleakala || Pan-STARRS || — || align=right | 2.6 km || 
|-id=362 bgcolor=#d6d6d6
| 487362 ||  || — || February 28, 2012 || Haleakala || Pan-STARRS || VER || align=right | 2.4 km || 
|-id=363 bgcolor=#d6d6d6
| 487363 ||  || — || January 30, 2011 || Haleakala || Pan-STARRS || — || align=right | 2.9 km || 
|-id=364 bgcolor=#E9E9E9
| 487364 ||  || — || October 1, 2005 || Kitt Peak || Spacewatch || — || align=right | 2.1 km || 
|-id=365 bgcolor=#d6d6d6
| 487365 ||  || — || July 31, 2014 || Haleakala || Pan-STARRS || — || align=right | 2.7 km || 
|-id=366 bgcolor=#fefefe
| 487366 ||  || — || January 15, 2009 || Kitt Peak || Spacewatch || — || align=right | 2.0 km || 
|-id=367 bgcolor=#d6d6d6
| 487367 ||  || — || December 8, 2010 || Mount Lemmon || Mount Lemmon Survey || — || align=right | 3.3 km || 
|-id=368 bgcolor=#d6d6d6
| 487368 ||  || — || October 27, 2009 || Mount Lemmon || Mount Lemmon Survey || — || align=right | 3.4 km || 
|-id=369 bgcolor=#d6d6d6
| 487369 ||  || — || November 30, 2005 || Kitt Peak || Spacewatch || — || align=right | 2.9 km || 
|-id=370 bgcolor=#E9E9E9
| 487370 ||  || — || March 11, 2008 || Mount Lemmon || Mount Lemmon Survey || — || align=right | 2.0 km || 
|-id=371 bgcolor=#d6d6d6
| 487371 ||  || — || September 22, 2009 || Mount Lemmon || Mount Lemmon Survey || — || align=right | 2.8 km || 
|-id=372 bgcolor=#d6d6d6
| 487372 ||  || — || December 17, 1999 || Kitt Peak || Spacewatch || EOS || align=right | 1.6 km || 
|-id=373 bgcolor=#E9E9E9
| 487373 ||  || — || April 21, 2013 || Catalina || CSS || — || align=right | 1.1 km || 
|-id=374 bgcolor=#d6d6d6
| 487374 ||  || — || August 22, 2014 || Haleakala || Pan-STARRS || EOS || align=right | 1.6 km || 
|-id=375 bgcolor=#d6d6d6
| 487375 ||  || — || January 30, 2006 || Kitt Peak || Spacewatch || — || align=right | 2.9 km || 
|-id=376 bgcolor=#d6d6d6
| 487376 ||  || — || February 15, 2012 || Haleakala || Pan-STARRS || EOS || align=right | 2.1 km || 
|-id=377 bgcolor=#d6d6d6
| 487377 ||  || — || February 27, 2007 || Kitt Peak || Spacewatch || — || align=right | 2.4 km || 
|-id=378 bgcolor=#d6d6d6
| 487378 ||  || — || September 30, 2009 || Mount Lemmon || Mount Lemmon Survey || — || align=right | 2.7 km || 
|-id=379 bgcolor=#E9E9E9
| 487379 ||  || — || July 28, 2014 || Haleakala || Pan-STARRS || — || align=right | 2.1 km || 
|-id=380 bgcolor=#d6d6d6
| 487380 ||  || — || May 15, 2013 || Haleakala || Pan-STARRS || — || align=right | 3.1 km || 
|-id=381 bgcolor=#E9E9E9
| 487381 ||  || — || March 2, 2009 || Mount Lemmon || Mount Lemmon Survey || — || align=right | 1.8 km || 
|-id=382 bgcolor=#E9E9E9
| 487382 ||  || — || August 25, 2014 || Haleakala || Pan-STARRS || — || align=right | 1.4 km || 
|-id=383 bgcolor=#E9E9E9
| 487383 ||  || — || March 16, 2013 || Catalina || CSS || — || align=right | 2.7 km || 
|-id=384 bgcolor=#d6d6d6
| 487384 ||  || — || January 7, 1994 || Kitt Peak || Spacewatch || — || align=right | 3.2 km || 
|-id=385 bgcolor=#d6d6d6
| 487385 ||  || — || September 15, 2009 || Kitt Peak || Spacewatch || critical || align=right | 2.4 km || 
|-id=386 bgcolor=#d6d6d6
| 487386 ||  || — || October 10, 2008 || Kitt Peak || Spacewatch || 7:4 || align=right | 3.0 km || 
|-id=387 bgcolor=#d6d6d6
| 487387 ||  || — || March 13, 2012 || Mount Lemmon || Mount Lemmon Survey || — || align=right | 3.2 km || 
|-id=388 bgcolor=#d6d6d6
| 487388 ||  || — || March 25, 2012 || Mount Lemmon || Mount Lemmon Survey || — || align=right | 2.8 km || 
|-id=389 bgcolor=#d6d6d6
| 487389 ||  || — || January 13, 2011 || Mount Lemmon || Mount Lemmon Survey || critical || align=right | 2.5 km || 
|-id=390 bgcolor=#E9E9E9
| 487390 ||  || — || December 14, 2010 || Mount Lemmon || Mount Lemmon Survey || — || align=right | 2.1 km || 
|-id=391 bgcolor=#d6d6d6
| 487391 ||  || — || September 30, 2005 || Mount Lemmon || Mount Lemmon Survey || 615 || align=right | 1.3 km || 
|-id=392 bgcolor=#fefefe
| 487392 ||  || — || October 26, 2011 || Haleakala || Pan-STARRS || — || align=right data-sort-value="0.74" | 740 m || 
|-id=393 bgcolor=#d6d6d6
| 487393 ||  || — || July 4, 2014 || Haleakala || Pan-STARRS || — || align=right | 2.1 km || 
|-id=394 bgcolor=#d6d6d6
| 487394 ||  || — || January 21, 2012 || Haleakala || Pan-STARRS || EOS || align=right | 1.8 km || 
|-id=395 bgcolor=#fefefe
| 487395 ||  || — || January 16, 2005 || Mauna Kea || C. Veillet || MAS || align=right data-sort-value="0.74" | 740 m || 
|-id=396 bgcolor=#d6d6d6
| 487396 ||  || — || March 15, 2007 || Mount Lemmon || Mount Lemmon Survey || EOS || align=right | 2.0 km || 
|-id=397 bgcolor=#d6d6d6
| 487397 ||  || — || August 3, 2008 || Siding Spring || SSS || — || align=right | 3.9 km || 
|-id=398 bgcolor=#d6d6d6
| 487398 ||  || — || March 29, 2012 || Haleakala || Pan-STARRS || — || align=right | 2.8 km || 
|-id=399 bgcolor=#d6d6d6
| 487399 ||  || — || December 18, 2004 || Mount Lemmon || Mount Lemmon Survey || — || align=right | 3.0 km || 
|-id=400 bgcolor=#d6d6d6
| 487400 ||  || — || September 16, 2009 || Mount Lemmon || Mount Lemmon Survey || — || align=right | 2.8 km || 
|}

487401–487500 

|-bgcolor=#d6d6d6
| 487401 ||  || — || January 4, 2011 || Mount Lemmon || Mount Lemmon Survey || — || align=right | 2.9 km || 
|-id=402 bgcolor=#d6d6d6
| 487402 ||  || — || January 27, 2012 || Mount Lemmon || Mount Lemmon Survey || — || align=right | 3.4 km || 
|-id=403 bgcolor=#d6d6d6
| 487403 ||  || — || September 19, 2009 || Kitt Peak || Spacewatch || EOS || align=right | 1.8 km || 
|-id=404 bgcolor=#d6d6d6
| 487404 ||  || — || August 15, 2014 || Haleakala || Pan-STARRS || — || align=right | 3.4 km || 
|-id=405 bgcolor=#d6d6d6
| 487405 ||  || — || February 27, 2012 || Haleakala || Pan-STARRS || VER || align=right | 2.5 km || 
|-id=406 bgcolor=#d6d6d6
| 487406 ||  || — || October 3, 2003 || Kitt Peak || Spacewatch || — || align=right | 3.2 km || 
|-id=407 bgcolor=#d6d6d6
| 487407 ||  || — || April 19, 2013 || Haleakala || Pan-STARRS || — || align=right | 2.7 km || 
|-id=408 bgcolor=#d6d6d6
| 487408 ||  || — || September 1, 2008 || La Sagra || OAM Obs. || — || align=right | 3.6 km || 
|-id=409 bgcolor=#d6d6d6
| 487409 ||  || — || April 14, 2012 || Haleakala || Pan-STARRS || — || align=right | 2.5 km || 
|-id=410 bgcolor=#E9E9E9
| 487410 ||  || — || November 3, 2010 || Mount Lemmon || Mount Lemmon Survey || NEM || align=right | 2.2 km || 
|-id=411 bgcolor=#E9E9E9
| 487411 ||  || — || August 31, 2005 || Kitt Peak || Spacewatch || — || align=right | 2.0 km || 
|-id=412 bgcolor=#E9E9E9
| 487412 ||  || — || November 12, 2010 || Mount Lemmon || Mount Lemmon Survey || — || align=right | 2.1 km || 
|-id=413 bgcolor=#d6d6d6
| 487413 ||  || — || September 26, 2008 || Mount Lemmon || Mount Lemmon Survey || — || align=right | 3.6 km || 
|-id=414 bgcolor=#d6d6d6
| 487414 ||  || — || February 25, 2012 || Kitt Peak || Spacewatch || — || align=right | 2.3 km || 
|-id=415 bgcolor=#d6d6d6
| 487415 ||  || — || August 28, 2014 || Haleakala || Pan-STARRS || EOS || align=right | 1.9 km || 
|-id=416 bgcolor=#d6d6d6
| 487416 ||  || — || January 6, 2006 || Socorro || LINEAR || — || align=right | 4.5 km || 
|-id=417 bgcolor=#d6d6d6
| 487417 ||  || — || March 9, 2007 || Mount Lemmon || Mount Lemmon Survey || — || align=right | 2.3 km || 
|-id=418 bgcolor=#E9E9E9
| 487418 ||  || — || September 19, 2006 || Kitt Peak || Spacewatch || — || align=right | 1.3 km || 
|-id=419 bgcolor=#E9E9E9
| 487419 ||  || — || October 23, 2005 || Catalina || CSS || — || align=right | 2.6 km || 
|-id=420 bgcolor=#d6d6d6
| 487420 ||  || — || September 18, 2003 || Kitt Peak || Spacewatch || — || align=right | 3.2 km || 
|-id=421 bgcolor=#E9E9E9
| 487421 ||  || — || February 28, 2008 || Kitt Peak || Spacewatch || HOF || align=right | 2.9 km || 
|-id=422 bgcolor=#d6d6d6
| 487422 ||  || — || January 16, 2011 || Mount Lemmon || Mount Lemmon Survey || — || align=right | 2.7 km || 
|-id=423 bgcolor=#d6d6d6
| 487423 ||  || — || September 30, 2003 || Kitt Peak || Spacewatch || — || align=right | 3.7 km || 
|-id=424 bgcolor=#d6d6d6
| 487424 ||  || — || October 23, 2009 || Kitt Peak || Spacewatch || — || align=right | 2.4 km || 
|-id=425 bgcolor=#E9E9E9
| 487425 ||  || — || August 29, 2006 || Kitt Peak || Spacewatch || — || align=right data-sort-value="0.98" | 980 m || 
|-id=426 bgcolor=#d6d6d6
| 487426 ||  || — || September 19, 2003 || Kitt Peak || Spacewatch || — || align=right | 3.2 km || 
|-id=427 bgcolor=#d6d6d6
| 487427 ||  || — || July 29, 2008 || Kitt Peak || Spacewatch || — || align=right | 3.8 km || 
|-id=428 bgcolor=#d6d6d6
| 487428 ||  || — || January 19, 2012 || Haleakala || Pan-STARRS || — || align=right | 3.0 km || 
|-id=429 bgcolor=#d6d6d6
| 487429 ||  || — || March 15, 2012 || Mount Lemmon || Mount Lemmon Survey || — || align=right | 2.8 km || 
|-id=430 bgcolor=#E9E9E9
| 487430 ||  || — || July 28, 2014 || Haleakala || Pan-STARRS || — || align=right | 2.8 km || 
|-id=431 bgcolor=#d6d6d6
| 487431 ||  || — || June 4, 2013 || Mount Lemmon || Mount Lemmon Survey || — || align=right | 2.1 km || 
|-id=432 bgcolor=#d6d6d6
| 487432 ||  || — || July 30, 2014 || Kitt Peak || Spacewatch || critical || align=right | 2.4 km || 
|-id=433 bgcolor=#d6d6d6
| 487433 ||  || — || January 2, 2006 || Mount Lemmon || Mount Lemmon Survey || EOS || align=right | 2.2 km || 
|-id=434 bgcolor=#fefefe
| 487434 ||  || — || October 30, 2007 || Mount Lemmon || Mount Lemmon Survey || MAS || align=right data-sort-value="0.70" | 700 m || 
|-id=435 bgcolor=#E9E9E9
| 487435 ||  || — || May 17, 2004 || Socorro || LINEAR || — || align=right | 2.6 km || 
|-id=436 bgcolor=#d6d6d6
| 487436 ||  || — || September 27, 2003 || Socorro || LINEAR || — || align=right | 2.8 km || 
|-id=437 bgcolor=#d6d6d6
| 487437 ||  || — || July 28, 2014 || Haleakala || Pan-STARRS || — || align=right | 2.7 km || 
|-id=438 bgcolor=#d6d6d6
| 487438 ||  || — || November 28, 1994 || Kitt Peak || Spacewatch || EOS || align=right | 2.0 km || 
|-id=439 bgcolor=#E9E9E9
| 487439 ||  || — || January 23, 1998 || Kitt Peak || Spacewatch || — || align=right | 2.5 km || 
|-id=440 bgcolor=#d6d6d6
| 487440 ||  || — || March 12, 2007 || Kitt Peak || Spacewatch || — || align=right | 2.1 km || 
|-id=441 bgcolor=#d6d6d6
| 487441 ||  || — || July 27, 2014 || Haleakala || Pan-STARRS || — || align=right | 2.7 km || 
|-id=442 bgcolor=#d6d6d6
| 487442 ||  || — || June 19, 2013 || Haleakala || Pan-STARRS || — || align=right | 2.8 km || 
|-id=443 bgcolor=#d6d6d6
| 487443 ||  || — || June 10, 2008 || Kitt Peak || Spacewatch || — || align=right | 3.2 km || 
|-id=444 bgcolor=#d6d6d6
| 487444 ||  || — || December 6, 2011 || Haleakala || Pan-STARRS || EOS || align=right | 2.3 km || 
|-id=445 bgcolor=#d6d6d6
| 487445 ||  || — || October 1, 2009 || Mount Lemmon || Mount Lemmon Survey || — || align=right | 3.9 km || 
|-id=446 bgcolor=#d6d6d6
| 487446 ||  || — || August 1, 2008 || Charleston || ARO || — || align=right | 3.6 km || 
|-id=447 bgcolor=#C2FFFF
| 487447 ||  || — || September 11, 2014 || Haleakala || Pan-STARRS || L5 || align=right | 9.8 km || 
|-id=448 bgcolor=#d6d6d6
| 487448 ||  || — || June 9, 2013 || Mount Lemmon || Mount Lemmon Survey || — || align=right | 3.9 km || 
|-id=449 bgcolor=#E9E9E9
| 487449 ||  || — || January 13, 2008 || Kitt Peak || Spacewatch || — || align=right | 1.3 km || 
|-id=450 bgcolor=#d6d6d6
| 487450 ||  || — || August 20, 2014 || Haleakala || Pan-STARRS || — || align=right | 2.7 km || 
|-id=451 bgcolor=#d6d6d6
| 487451 ||  || — || November 18, 2003 || Kitt Peak || Spacewatch || — || align=right | 3.1 km || 
|-id=452 bgcolor=#d6d6d6
| 487452 ||  || — || October 1, 2003 || Kitt Peak || Spacewatch || VER || align=right | 2.3 km || 
|-id=453 bgcolor=#d6d6d6
| 487453 ||  || — || February 13, 2012 || Kitt Peak || Spacewatch || EOS || align=right | 1.6 km || 
|-id=454 bgcolor=#d6d6d6
| 487454 ||  || — || October 9, 2004 || Socorro || LINEAR || — || align=right | 2.5 km || 
|-id=455 bgcolor=#d6d6d6
| 487455 ||  || — || January 27, 2007 || Kitt Peak || Spacewatch || — || align=right | 2.3 km || 
|-id=456 bgcolor=#E9E9E9
| 487456 ||  || — || October 9, 2005 || Kitt Peak || Spacewatch || AGN || align=right | 1.0 km || 
|-id=457 bgcolor=#d6d6d6
| 487457 ||  || — || March 3, 2006 || Kitt Peak || Spacewatch || — || align=right | 2.4 km || 
|-id=458 bgcolor=#d6d6d6
| 487458 ||  || — || January 15, 2011 || Mount Lemmon || Mount Lemmon Survey || — || align=right | 3.0 km || 
|-id=459 bgcolor=#d6d6d6
| 487459 ||  || — || March 2, 2006 || Kitt Peak || Spacewatch || — || align=right | 2.3 km || 
|-id=460 bgcolor=#d6d6d6
| 487460 ||  || — || February 23, 2012 || Kitt Peak || Spacewatch || — || align=right | 2.3 km || 
|-id=461 bgcolor=#d6d6d6
| 487461 ||  || — || February 27, 2006 || Kitt Peak || Spacewatch || — || align=right | 3.0 km || 
|-id=462 bgcolor=#d6d6d6
| 487462 ||  || — || August 4, 2008 || Siding Spring || SSS || — || align=right | 3.8 km || 
|-id=463 bgcolor=#d6d6d6
| 487463 ||  || — || August 16, 2009 || Kitt Peak || Spacewatch || KOR || align=right | 1.6 km || 
|-id=464 bgcolor=#d6d6d6
| 487464 ||  || — || March 9, 2007 || Kitt Peak || Spacewatch || EOS || align=right | 1.4 km || 
|-id=465 bgcolor=#d6d6d6
| 487465 ||  || — || October 25, 2003 || Kitt Peak || Spacewatch || — || align=right | 4.1 km || 
|-id=466 bgcolor=#d6d6d6
| 487466 ||  || — || February 23, 2007 || Kitt Peak || Spacewatch || — || align=right | 2.4 km || 
|-id=467 bgcolor=#d6d6d6
| 487467 ||  || — || February 28, 2010 || WISE || WISE || — || align=right | 2.8 km || 
|-id=468 bgcolor=#d6d6d6
| 487468 ||  || — || September 19, 2014 || Haleakala || Pan-STARRS || EOS || align=right | 2.0 km || 
|-id=469 bgcolor=#E9E9E9
| 487469 ||  || — || January 10, 2008 || Mount Lemmon || Mount Lemmon Survey || — || align=right | 1.5 km || 
|-id=470 bgcolor=#d6d6d6
| 487470 ||  || — || March 18, 2007 || Kitt Peak || Spacewatch || — || align=right | 4.0 km || 
|-id=471 bgcolor=#d6d6d6
| 487471 ||  || — || May 15, 2013 || Haleakala || Pan-STARRS || — || align=right | 3.0 km || 
|-id=472 bgcolor=#E9E9E9
| 487472 ||  || — || July 25, 2010 || WISE || WISE || — || align=right | 1.1 km || 
|-id=473 bgcolor=#d6d6d6
| 487473 ||  || — || February 27, 2006 || Mount Lemmon || Mount Lemmon Survey || — || align=right | 2.5 km || 
|-id=474 bgcolor=#d6d6d6
| 487474 ||  || — || February 16, 2012 || Haleakala || Pan-STARRS || — || align=right | 2.2 km || 
|-id=475 bgcolor=#E9E9E9
| 487475 ||  || — || October 23, 2005 || Catalina || CSS || — || align=right | 2.1 km || 
|-id=476 bgcolor=#d6d6d6
| 487476 ||  || — || August 27, 2014 || Haleakala || Pan-STARRS || THM || align=right | 1.9 km || 
|-id=477 bgcolor=#fefefe
| 487477 ||  || — || October 17, 2007 || Mount Lemmon || Mount Lemmon Survey || — || align=right data-sort-value="0.89" | 890 m || 
|-id=478 bgcolor=#d6d6d6
| 487478 ||  || — || January 8, 2006 || Kitt Peak || Spacewatch || — || align=right | 2.7 km || 
|-id=479 bgcolor=#d6d6d6
| 487479 ||  || — || June 7, 2007 || Kitt Peak || Spacewatch || — || align=right | 3.4 km || 
|-id=480 bgcolor=#d6d6d6
| 487480 ||  || — || May 22, 2012 || Mount Lemmon || Mount Lemmon Survey || — || align=right | 3.4 km || 
|-id=481 bgcolor=#d6d6d6
| 487481 ||  || — || March 4, 2005 || Kitt Peak || Spacewatch || — || align=right | 3.0 km || 
|-id=482 bgcolor=#d6d6d6
| 487482 ||  || — || March 9, 2005 || Mount Lemmon || Mount Lemmon Survey || — || align=right | 3.4 km || 
|-id=483 bgcolor=#d6d6d6
| 487483 ||  || — || September 20, 2014 || Haleakala || Pan-STARRS || — || align=right | 3.4 km || 
|-id=484 bgcolor=#d6d6d6
| 487484 ||  || — || October 2, 2003 || Kitt Peak || Spacewatch || — || align=right | 2.9 km || 
|-id=485 bgcolor=#d6d6d6
| 487485 ||  || — || March 25, 2007 || Mount Lemmon || Mount Lemmon Survey || — || align=right | 3.2 km || 
|-id=486 bgcolor=#E9E9E9
| 487486 ||  || — || October 24, 2005 || Kitt Peak || Spacewatch || HOF || align=right | 3.2 km || 
|-id=487 bgcolor=#d6d6d6
| 487487 ||  || — || April 24, 2007 || Mount Lemmon || Mount Lemmon Survey || — || align=right | 4.6 km || 
|-id=488 bgcolor=#d6d6d6
| 487488 ||  || — || September 19, 2003 || Kitt Peak || Spacewatch || — || align=right | 3.2 km || 
|-id=489 bgcolor=#E9E9E9
| 487489 ||  || — || November 10, 2010 || Mount Lemmon || Mount Lemmon Survey || — || align=right | 1.4 km || 
|-id=490 bgcolor=#d6d6d6
| 487490 ||  || — || September 22, 2004 || Anderson Mesa || LONEOS || — || align=right | 4.1 km || 
|-id=491 bgcolor=#d6d6d6
| 487491 ||  || — || August 23, 2004 || Kitt Peak || Spacewatch || — || align=right | 2.8 km || 
|-id=492 bgcolor=#d6d6d6
| 487492 ||  || — || February 19, 2012 || Kitt Peak || Spacewatch || EOS || align=right | 2.0 km || 
|-id=493 bgcolor=#E9E9E9
| 487493 ||  || — || October 1, 2005 || Kitt Peak || Spacewatch ||  || align=right | 2.5 km || 
|-id=494 bgcolor=#d6d6d6
| 487494 ||  || — || September 30, 2009 || Mount Lemmon || Mount Lemmon Survey || EOS || align=right | 2.6 km || 
|-id=495 bgcolor=#d6d6d6
| 487495 ||  || — || August 10, 2008 || La Sagra || OAM Obs. || — || align=right | 3.5 km || 
|-id=496 bgcolor=#B88A00
| 487496 ||  || — || July 2, 2013 || Haleakala || Pan-STARRS || unusualcritical || align=right | 6.4 km || 
|-id=497 bgcolor=#d6d6d6
| 487497 ||  || — || January 30, 2011 || Haleakala || Pan-STARRS || Tj (2.98) || align=right | 3.0 km || 
|-id=498 bgcolor=#d6d6d6
| 487498 ||  || — || December 27, 2005 || Kitt Peak || Spacewatch || — || align=right | 4.2 km || 
|-id=499 bgcolor=#d6d6d6
| 487499 ||  || — || August 28, 2014 || Haleakala || Pan-STARRS || — || align=right | 3.3 km || 
|-id=500 bgcolor=#d6d6d6
| 487500 ||  || — || March 14, 2012 || Kitt Peak || Spacewatch || — || align=right | 3.2 km || 
|}

487501–487600 

|-bgcolor=#d6d6d6
| 487501 ||  || — || May 15, 2012 || Haleakala || Pan-STARRS || EOS || align=right | 2.4 km || 
|-id=502 bgcolor=#E9E9E9
| 487502 ||  || — || August 18, 2009 || Kitt Peak || Spacewatch || AGN || align=right | 1.1 km || 
|-id=503 bgcolor=#d6d6d6
| 487503 ||  || — || September 22, 2009 || Mount Lemmon || Mount Lemmon Survey || — || align=right | 3.1 km || 
|-id=504 bgcolor=#E9E9E9
| 487504 ||  || — || October 21, 2006 || Kitt Peak || Spacewatch || — || align=right | 1.00 km || 
|-id=505 bgcolor=#d6d6d6
| 487505 ||  || — || June 10, 1997 || Kitt Peak || Spacewatch || — || align=right | 2.7 km || 
|-id=506 bgcolor=#C2FFFF
| 487506 ||  || — || September 18, 2014 || Haleakala || Pan-STARRS || L5 || align=right | 7.7 km || 
|-id=507 bgcolor=#d6d6d6
| 487507 ||  || — || November 17, 2004 || Campo Imperatore || CINEOS || — || align=right | 3.8 km || 
|-id=508 bgcolor=#d6d6d6
| 487508 ||  || — || November 17, 2009 || Kitt Peak || Spacewatch || — || align=right | 3.0 km || 
|-id=509 bgcolor=#d6d6d6
| 487509 ||  || — || October 1, 2014 || Kitt Peak || Spacewatch || — || align=right | 3.0 km || 
|-id=510 bgcolor=#d6d6d6
| 487510 ||  || — || March 29, 2006 || Kitt Peak || Spacewatch || — || align=right | 3.4 km || 
|-id=511 bgcolor=#E9E9E9
| 487511 ||  || — || September 2, 2014 || Haleakala || Pan-STARRS || EUN || align=right | 1.8 km || 
|-id=512 bgcolor=#d6d6d6
| 487512 ||  || — || February 18, 2010 || WISE || WISE || — || align=right | 3.2 km || 
|-id=513 bgcolor=#d6d6d6
| 487513 ||  || — || October 14, 1998 || Caussols || ODAS || EMA || align=right | 2.8 km || 
|-id=514 bgcolor=#d6d6d6
| 487514 ||  || — || October 1, 2003 || Kitt Peak || Spacewatch || — || align=right | 3.2 km || 
|-id=515 bgcolor=#d6d6d6
| 487515 ||  || — || October 1, 2003 || Kitt Peak || Spacewatch || — || align=right | 5.1 km || 
|-id=516 bgcolor=#d6d6d6
| 487516 ||  || — || February 27, 2012 || Haleakala || Pan-STARRS || EOS || align=right | 2.1 km || 
|-id=517 bgcolor=#d6d6d6
| 487517 ||  || — || September 28, 2008 || Catalina || CSS || VER || align=right | 3.2 km || 
|-id=518 bgcolor=#d6d6d6
| 487518 ||  || — || October 8, 2004 || Anderson Mesa || LONEOS || — || align=right | 3.1 km || 
|-id=519 bgcolor=#d6d6d6
| 487519 ||  || — || October 7, 2008 || Mount Lemmon || Mount Lemmon Survey || — || align=right | 3.3 km || 
|-id=520 bgcolor=#d6d6d6
| 487520 ||  || — || July 17, 2007 || La Sagra || OAM Obs. || — || align=right | 3.9 km || 
|-id=521 bgcolor=#d6d6d6
| 487521 ||  || — || March 16, 2010 || WISE || WISE || — || align=right | 4.3 km || 
|-id=522 bgcolor=#d6d6d6
| 487522 ||  || — || May 14, 2012 || Mount Lemmon || Mount Lemmon Survey || EOS || align=right | 2.8 km || 
|-id=523 bgcolor=#d6d6d6
| 487523 ||  || — || November 10, 2009 || Kitt Peak || Spacewatch || — || align=right | 3.1 km || 
|-id=524 bgcolor=#E9E9E9
| 487524 ||  || — || March 31, 2008 || Kitt Peak || Spacewatch || — || align=right | 2.7 km || 
|-id=525 bgcolor=#d6d6d6
| 487525 ||  || — || August 30, 2008 || La Sagra || OAM Obs. || — || align=right | 4.3 km || 
|-id=526 bgcolor=#d6d6d6
| 487526 ||  || — || October 15, 2014 || Kitt Peak || Spacewatch || EOS || align=right | 2.2 km || 
|-id=527 bgcolor=#d6d6d6
| 487527 ||  || — || November 19, 2009 || Mount Lemmon || Mount Lemmon Survey || — || align=right | 3.5 km || 
|-id=528 bgcolor=#d6d6d6
| 487528 ||  || — || May 1, 2006 || Kitt Peak || Spacewatch || — || align=right | 4.0 km || 
|-id=529 bgcolor=#d6d6d6
| 487529 ||  || — || September 5, 2008 || Kitt Peak || Spacewatch || VER || align=right | 2.7 km || 
|-id=530 bgcolor=#d6d6d6
| 487530 ||  || — || September 7, 2008 || Catalina || CSS || — || align=right | 3.7 km || 
|-id=531 bgcolor=#d6d6d6
| 487531 ||  || — || October 16, 2014 || Kitt Peak || Spacewatch || EOS || align=right | 2.2 km || 
|-id=532 bgcolor=#d6d6d6
| 487532 ||  || — || May 1, 2012 || Mount Lemmon || Mount Lemmon Survey || — || align=right | 3.5 km || 
|-id=533 bgcolor=#d6d6d6
| 487533 ||  || — || March 11, 2007 || Kitt Peak || Spacewatch || — || align=right | 3.2 km || 
|-id=534 bgcolor=#d6d6d6
| 487534 ||  || — || October 17, 2003 || Kitt Peak || Spacewatch || — || align=right | 4.3 km || 
|-id=535 bgcolor=#C2FFFF
| 487535 ||  || — || October 26, 2014 || Haleakala || Pan-STARRS || L5 || align=right | 9.1 km || 
|-id=536 bgcolor=#d6d6d6
| 487536 ||  || — || November 24, 2003 || Kitt Peak || Spacewatch || VER || align=right | 3.6 km || 
|-id=537 bgcolor=#d6d6d6
| 487537 ||  || — || November 24, 2009 || Kitt Peak || Spacewatch || — || align=right | 3.0 km || 
|-id=538 bgcolor=#d6d6d6
| 487538 ||  || — || March 15, 2012 || Haleakala || Pan-STARRS || — || align=right | 3.7 km || 
|-id=539 bgcolor=#C2FFFF
| 487539 ||  || — || August 13, 2012 || Haleakala || Pan-STARRS || L5 || align=right | 7.4 km || 
|-id=540 bgcolor=#d6d6d6
| 487540 ||  || — || October 14, 2009 || La Sagra || OAM Obs. || — || align=right | 4.3 km || 
|-id=541 bgcolor=#d6d6d6
| 487541 ||  || — || October 3, 2003 || Kitt Peak || Spacewatch || — || align=right | 3.8 km || 
|-id=542 bgcolor=#d6d6d6
| 487542 ||  || — || March 13, 2007 || Mount Lemmon || Mount Lemmon Survey || EOS || align=right | 2.2 km || 
|-id=543 bgcolor=#d6d6d6
| 487543 ||  || — || September 30, 1997 || Kitt Peak || Spacewatch || VER || align=right | 3.2 km || 
|-id=544 bgcolor=#d6d6d6
| 487544 ||  || — || October 16, 2014 || Kitt Peak || Spacewatch || — || align=right | 3.7 km || 
|-id=545 bgcolor=#C2FFFF
| 487545 ||  || — || August 24, 2012 || Kitt Peak || Spacewatch || L5 || align=right | 7.4 km || 
|-id=546 bgcolor=#d6d6d6
| 487546 ||  || — || January 11, 2011 || Kitt Peak || Spacewatch || — || align=right | 3.8 km || 
|-id=547 bgcolor=#d6d6d6
| 487547 ||  || — || February 7, 2010 || WISE || WISE || — || align=right | 3.9 km || 
|-id=548 bgcolor=#E9E9E9
| 487548 ||  || — || November 8, 2010 || Kitt Peak || Spacewatch || — || align=right | 1.2 km || 
|-id=549 bgcolor=#d6d6d6
| 487549 ||  || — || February 23, 2007 || Kitt Peak || Spacewatch || — || align=right | 3.3 km || 
|-id=550 bgcolor=#d6d6d6
| 487550 ||  || — || December 10, 2009 || Mount Lemmon || Mount Lemmon Survey || — || align=right | 3.7 km || 
|-id=551 bgcolor=#d6d6d6
| 487551 ||  || — || November 10, 2009 || Kitt Peak || Spacewatch || — || align=right | 3.3 km || 
|-id=552 bgcolor=#C2FFFF
| 487552 ||  || — || October 3, 2014 || Mount Lemmon || Mount Lemmon Survey || L5 || align=right | 8.8 km || 
|-id=553 bgcolor=#C2FFFF
| 487553 ||  || — || August 22, 2011 || Haleakala || Pan-STARRS || L5 || align=right | 10 km || 
|-id=554 bgcolor=#C2FFFF
| 487554 ||  || — || July 2, 2011 || Kitt Peak || Spacewatch || L5 || align=right | 8.4 km || 
|-id=555 bgcolor=#C2FFFF
| 487555 ||  || — || July 16, 2013 || Haleakala || Pan-STARRS || L5 || align=right | 8.7 km || 
|-id=556 bgcolor=#d6d6d6
| 487556 ||  || — || December 9, 2004 || Kitt Peak || Spacewatch || — || align=right | 3.6 km || 
|-id=557 bgcolor=#d6d6d6
| 487557 ||  || — || May 31, 2006 || Mount Lemmon || Mount Lemmon Survey || — || align=right | 3.9 km || 
|-id=558 bgcolor=#d6d6d6
| 487558 ||  || — || October 22, 2006 || Mount Lemmon || Mount Lemmon Survey || SHU3:2 || align=right | 6.3 km || 
|-id=559 bgcolor=#d6d6d6
| 487559 ||  || — || April 13, 2012 || Haleakala || Pan-STARRS || — || align=right | 2.9 km || 
|-id=560 bgcolor=#d6d6d6
| 487560 ||  || — || September 29, 2005 || Kitt Peak || Spacewatch || 3:2 || align=right | 4.3 km || 
|-id=561 bgcolor=#d6d6d6
| 487561 ||  || — || January 27, 2011 || Mount Lemmon || Mount Lemmon Survey || — || align=right | 3.7 km || 
|-id=562 bgcolor=#d6d6d6
| 487562 ||  || — || April 24, 2012 || Haleakala || Pan-STARRS || VER || align=right | 3.4 km || 
|-id=563 bgcolor=#E9E9E9
| 487563 ||  || — || June 18, 2013 || Haleakala || Pan-STARRS || — || align=right | 1.2 km || 
|-id=564 bgcolor=#d6d6d6
| 487564 ||  || — || September 28, 2008 || Mount Lemmon || Mount Lemmon Survey || — || align=right | 3.2 km || 
|-id=565 bgcolor=#d6d6d6
| 487565 ||  || — || January 27, 2006 || Mount Lemmon || Mount Lemmon Survey || KOR || align=right | 1.4 km || 
|-id=566 bgcolor=#d6d6d6
| 487566 ||  || — || January 30, 2011 || Haleakala || Pan-STARRS || — || align=right | 2.9 km || 
|-id=567 bgcolor=#d6d6d6
| 487567 ||  || — || January 30, 2011 || Haleakala || Pan-STARRS || — || align=right | 2.4 km || 
|-id=568 bgcolor=#d6d6d6
| 487568 ||  || — || October 30, 2008 || Catalina || CSS || — || align=right | 4.6 km || 
|-id=569 bgcolor=#E9E9E9
| 487569 ||  || — || December 29, 2000 || Kitt Peak || Spacewatch || — || align=right | 2.5 km || 
|-id=570 bgcolor=#C2FFFF
| 487570 ||  || — || November 28, 2014 || Catalina || CSS || L5 || align=right | 13 km || 
|-id=571 bgcolor=#C2FFFF
| 487571 ||  || — || February 24, 2006 || Mount Lemmon || Mount Lemmon Survey || L5 || align=right | 8.6 km || 
|-id=572 bgcolor=#C2FFFF
| 487572 ||  || — || February 24, 2006 || Mount Lemmon || Mount Lemmon Survey || L5 || align=right | 8.8 km || 
|-id=573 bgcolor=#C2FFFF
| 487573 ||  || — || April 24, 2008 || Kitt Peak || Spacewatch || L5 || align=right | 9.2 km || 
|-id=574 bgcolor=#d6d6d6
| 487574 ||  || — || June 30, 2013 || Haleakala || Pan-STARRS || — || align=right | 3.3 km || 
|-id=575 bgcolor=#d6d6d6
| 487575 ||  || — || February 21, 2011 || Haleakala || Pan-STARRS || — || align=right | 4.3 km || 
|-id=576 bgcolor=#E9E9E9
| 487576 ||  || — || December 7, 2005 || Catalina || CSS || — || align=right | 1.7 km || 
|-id=577 bgcolor=#FFC2E0
| 487577 ||  || — || December 7, 2014 || Haleakala || Pan-STARRS || ATEPHAcritical || align=right data-sort-value="0.20" | 200 m || 
|-id=578 bgcolor=#d6d6d6
| 487578 ||  || — || September 10, 2007 || Kitt Peak || Spacewatch || THM || align=right | 2.7 km || 
|-id=579 bgcolor=#d6d6d6
| 487579 ||  || — || March 13, 2010 || WISE || WISE || — || align=right | 2.7 km || 
|-id=580 bgcolor=#FFC2E0
| 487580 ||  || — || January 17, 2015 || Haleakala || Pan-STARRS || APO || align=right data-sort-value="0.33" | 330 m || 
|-id=581 bgcolor=#C2E0FF
| 487581 ||  || — || January 20, 2015 || Haleakala || Pan-STARRS || other TNO || align=right | 335 km || 
|-id=582 bgcolor=#fefefe
| 487582 ||  || — || February 13, 2012 || Haleakala || Pan-STARRS || H || align=right data-sort-value="0.68" | 680 m || 
|-id=583 bgcolor=#FFC2E0
| 487583 ||  || — || March 20, 2015 || Haleakala || Pan-STARRS || APOcritical || align=right data-sort-value="0.13" | 130 m || 
|-id=584 bgcolor=#E9E9E9
| 487584 ||  || — || August 30, 1998 || Xinglong || SCAP || — || align=right | 1.5 km || 
|-id=585 bgcolor=#fefefe
| 487585 ||  || — || September 26, 2006 || Kitt Peak || Spacewatch || H || align=right data-sort-value="0.37" | 370 m || 
|-id=586 bgcolor=#fefefe
| 487586 ||  || — || April 19, 2007 || Kitt Peak || Spacewatch || H || align=right data-sort-value="0.66" | 660 m || 
|-id=587 bgcolor=#d6d6d6
| 487587 ||  || — || October 14, 2007 || Mount Lemmon || Mount Lemmon Survey || — || align=right | 2.9 km || 
|-id=588 bgcolor=#fefefe
| 487588 ||  || — || August 2, 2013 || Haleakala || Pan-STARRS || H || align=right data-sort-value="0.83" | 830 m || 
|-id=589 bgcolor=#E9E9E9
| 487589 ||  || — || April 11, 2007 || Mount Lemmon || Mount Lemmon Survey || — || align=right | 1.2 km || 
|-id=590 bgcolor=#d6d6d6
| 487590 ||  || — || September 17, 2012 || Kitt Peak || Spacewatch || EOS || align=right | 1.8 km || 
|-id=591 bgcolor=#d6d6d6
| 487591 ||  || — || February 13, 2012 || Haleakala || Pan-STARRS || Tj (2.85) || align=right | 4.5 km || 
|-id=592 bgcolor=#fefefe
| 487592 ||  || — || October 30, 2008 || Mount Lemmon || Mount Lemmon Survey || H || align=right data-sort-value="0.59" | 590 m || 
|-id=593 bgcolor=#E9E9E9
| 487593 ||  || — || April 23, 2015 || Haleakala || Pan-STARRS || — || align=right data-sort-value="0.99" | 990 m || 
|-id=594 bgcolor=#FA8072
| 487594 ||  || — || May 24, 2011 || Haleakala || Pan-STARRS || — || align=right data-sort-value="0.94" | 940 m || 
|-id=595 bgcolor=#E9E9E9
| 487595 ||  || — || December 17, 2007 || Mount Lemmon || Mount Lemmon Survey || — || align=right | 2.4 km || 
|-id=596 bgcolor=#fefefe
| 487596 ||  || — || May 4, 2005 || Kitt Peak || Spacewatch || — || align=right data-sort-value="0.74" | 740 m || 
|-id=597 bgcolor=#E9E9E9
| 487597 ||  || — || December 7, 2012 || Mount Lemmon || Mount Lemmon Survey || — || align=right | 2.4 km || 
|-id=598 bgcolor=#fefefe
| 487598 ||  || — || October 21, 2012 || Haleakala || Pan-STARRS || — || align=right data-sort-value="0.99" | 990 m || 
|-id=599 bgcolor=#fefefe
| 487599 ||  || — || September 16, 2012 || Catalina || CSS || — || align=right data-sort-value="0.90" | 900 m || 
|-id=600 bgcolor=#E9E9E9
| 487600 ||  || — || June 13, 2015 || Haleakala || Pan-STARRS || — || align=right | 2.0 km || 
|}

487601–487700 

|-bgcolor=#E9E9E9
| 487601 ||  || — || January 10, 2013 || Kitt Peak || Spacewatch || EUN || align=right | 1.1 km || 
|-id=602 bgcolor=#E9E9E9
| 487602 ||  || — || November 2, 2008 || Mount Lemmon || Mount Lemmon Survey || — || align=right | 1.8 km || 
|-id=603 bgcolor=#d6d6d6
| 487603 ||  || — || December 27, 2005 || Mount Lemmon || Mount Lemmon Survey || — || align=right | 2.7 km || 
|-id=604 bgcolor=#d6d6d6
| 487604 ||  || — || February 24, 2012 || Mount Lemmon || Mount Lemmon Survey || — || align=right | 2.8 km || 
|-id=605 bgcolor=#fefefe
| 487605 ||  || — || November 24, 2003 || Kitt Peak || Spacewatch || H || align=right data-sort-value="0.59" | 590 m || 
|-id=606 bgcolor=#d6d6d6
| 487606 ||  || — || April 4, 2014 || Haleakala || Pan-STARRS || EOS || align=right | 1.4 km || 
|-id=607 bgcolor=#fefefe
| 487607 ||  || — || March 25, 2011 || Haleakala || Pan-STARRS || — || align=right | 1.0 km || 
|-id=608 bgcolor=#d6d6d6
| 487608 ||  || — || December 12, 2006 || Mount Lemmon || Mount Lemmon Survey || EOS || align=right | 2.2 km || 
|-id=609 bgcolor=#fefefe
| 487609 ||  || — || July 28, 2011 || Haleakala || Pan-STARRS || — || align=right data-sort-value="0.94" | 940 m || 
|-id=610 bgcolor=#d6d6d6
| 487610 ||  || — || January 10, 2013 || Haleakala || Pan-STARRS || — || align=right | 2.8 km || 
|-id=611 bgcolor=#fefefe
| 487611 ||  || — || September 3, 2008 || La Sagra || OAM Obs. || — || align=right data-sort-value="0.94" | 940 m || 
|-id=612 bgcolor=#E9E9E9
| 487612 ||  || — || December 21, 2008 || Mount Lemmon || Mount Lemmon Survey || — || align=right | 1.2 km || 
|-id=613 bgcolor=#FA8072
| 487613 ||  || — || November 22, 2009 || Catalina || CSS || — || align=right | 1.1 km || 
|-id=614 bgcolor=#fefefe
| 487614 ||  || — || November 30, 2000 || Socorro || LINEAR || H || align=right data-sort-value="0.52" | 520 m || 
|-id=615 bgcolor=#fefefe
| 487615 ||  || — || December 21, 2006 || Kitt Peak || Spacewatch || — || align=right data-sort-value="0.71" | 710 m || 
|-id=616 bgcolor=#E9E9E9
| 487616 ||  || — || September 21, 2011 || Haleakala || Pan-STARRS || — || align=right | 2.4 km || 
|-id=617 bgcolor=#fefefe
| 487617 Ingethiering ||  ||  || October 20, 2012 || Haleakala || Pan-STARRS || V || align=right data-sort-value="0.53" | 530 m || 
|-id=618 bgcolor=#d6d6d6
| 487618 ||  || — || June 20, 2010 || WISE || WISE || — || align=right | 2.5 km || 
|-id=619 bgcolor=#E9E9E9
| 487619 ||  || — || January 28, 2004 || Kitt Peak || Spacewatch || — || align=right | 1.4 km || 
|-id=620 bgcolor=#fefefe
| 487620 ||  || — || December 6, 2013 || Haleakala || Pan-STARRS || H || align=right data-sort-value="0.78" | 780 m || 
|-id=621 bgcolor=#E9E9E9
| 487621 ||  || — || September 8, 2011 || Haleakala || Pan-STARRS || — || align=right | 1.5 km || 
|-id=622 bgcolor=#E9E9E9
| 487622 ||  || — || September 26, 2011 || Haleakala || Pan-STARRS || — || align=right | 1.9 km || 
|-id=623 bgcolor=#E9E9E9
| 487623 ||  || — || September 28, 2003 || Anderson Mesa || LONEOS || — || align=right data-sort-value="0.93" | 930 m || 
|-id=624 bgcolor=#E9E9E9
| 487624 ||  || — || October 25, 2011 || Haleakala || Pan-STARRS || — || align=right | 1.7 km || 
|-id=625 bgcolor=#E9E9E9
| 487625 ||  || — || July 26, 2011 || Haleakala || Pan-STARRS || MAR || align=right | 1.3 km || 
|-id=626 bgcolor=#fefefe
| 487626 ||  || — || December 25, 2005 || Kitt Peak || Spacewatch || — || align=right data-sort-value="0.84" | 840 m || 
|-id=627 bgcolor=#d6d6d6
| 487627 ||  || — || October 28, 2006 || Catalina || CSS || — || align=right | 3.5 km || 
|-id=628 bgcolor=#E9E9E9
| 487628 ||  || — || November 2, 2007 || Mount Lemmon || Mount Lemmon Survey || — || align=right | 1.2 km || 
|-id=629 bgcolor=#fefefe
| 487629 ||  || — || December 25, 2005 || Mount Lemmon || Mount Lemmon Survey || V || align=right data-sort-value="0.63" | 630 m || 
|-id=630 bgcolor=#E9E9E9
| 487630 ||  || — || May 14, 2015 || Haleakala || Pan-STARRS || MAR || align=right | 1.1 km || 
|-id=631 bgcolor=#E9E9E9
| 487631 ||  || — || March 2, 2006 || Kitt Peak || Spacewatch || — || align=right | 1.2 km || 
|-id=632 bgcolor=#fefefe
| 487632 ||  || — || October 26, 2005 || Kitt Peak || Spacewatch || — || align=right data-sort-value="0.82" | 820 m || 
|-id=633 bgcolor=#E9E9E9
| 487633 ||  || — || September 12, 2007 || Catalina || CSS || — || align=right data-sort-value="0.97" | 970 m || 
|-id=634 bgcolor=#fefefe
| 487634 ||  || — || December 22, 2008 || Kitt Peak || Spacewatch || — || align=right data-sort-value="0.79" | 790 m || 
|-id=635 bgcolor=#d6d6d6
| 487635 ||  || — || June 22, 2015 || Mount Lemmon || Mount Lemmon Survey || — || align=right | 3.0 km || 
|-id=636 bgcolor=#fefefe
| 487636 ||  || — || November 16, 2009 || Mount Lemmon || Mount Lemmon Survey || V || align=right data-sort-value="0.68" | 680 m || 
|-id=637 bgcolor=#E9E9E9
| 487637 ||  || — || February 3, 2009 || Kitt Peak || Spacewatch || — || align=right | 2.4 km || 
|-id=638 bgcolor=#E9E9E9
| 487638 ||  || — || May 7, 2010 || Kitt Peak || Spacewatch || EUN || align=right | 1.0 km || 
|-id=639 bgcolor=#fefefe
| 487639 ||  || — || April 13, 2011 || Mount Lemmon || Mount Lemmon Survey || — || align=right data-sort-value="0.87" | 870 m || 
|-id=640 bgcolor=#fefefe
| 487640 ||  || — || December 6, 2013 || Haleakala || Pan-STARRS || H || align=right data-sort-value="0.83" | 830 m || 
|-id=641 bgcolor=#fefefe
| 487641 ||  || — || April 22, 2007 || Mount Lemmon || Mount Lemmon Survey || — || align=right data-sort-value="0.89" | 890 m || 
|-id=642 bgcolor=#fefefe
| 487642 ||  || — || November 26, 2005 || Kitt Peak || Spacewatch || — || align=right data-sort-value="0.90" | 900 m || 
|-id=643 bgcolor=#d6d6d6
| 487643 ||  || — || September 16, 2010 || Kitt Peak || Spacewatch || — || align=right | 3.2 km || 
|-id=644 bgcolor=#d6d6d6
| 487644 ||  || — || July 27, 2010 || WISE || WISE || — || align=right | 3.3 km || 
|-id=645 bgcolor=#E9E9E9
| 487645 ||  || — || October 25, 2011 || Haleakala || Pan-STARRS || — || align=right | 1.5 km || 
|-id=646 bgcolor=#E9E9E9
| 487646 ||  || — || October 28, 2011 || Mount Lemmon || Mount Lemmon Survey || — || align=right | 1.8 km || 
|-id=647 bgcolor=#fefefe
| 487647 ||  || — || January 8, 2010 || Kitt Peak || Spacewatch || — || align=right data-sort-value="0.68" | 680 m || 
|-id=648 bgcolor=#E9E9E9
| 487648 ||  || — || June 13, 2015 || Mount Lemmon || Mount Lemmon Survey || — || align=right | 2.3 km || 
|-id=649 bgcolor=#E9E9E9
| 487649 ||  || — || January 17, 2005 || Kitt Peak || Spacewatch || MAR || align=right data-sort-value="0.98" | 980 m || 
|-id=650 bgcolor=#E9E9E9
| 487650 ||  || — || January 2, 2009 || Kitt Peak || Spacewatch || — || align=right data-sort-value="0.91" | 910 m || 
|-id=651 bgcolor=#fefefe
| 487651 ||  || — || January 8, 2006 || Mount Lemmon || Mount Lemmon Survey || — || align=right data-sort-value="0.72" | 720 m || 
|-id=652 bgcolor=#fefefe
| 487652 ||  || — || August 4, 2011 || Haleakala || Pan-STARRS || — || align=right data-sort-value="0.85" | 850 m || 
|-id=653 bgcolor=#fefefe
| 487653 ||  || — || August 1, 2008 || La Sagra || OAM Obs. || — || align=right data-sort-value="0.81" | 810 m || 
|-id=654 bgcolor=#fefefe
| 487654 ||  || — || September 29, 2008 || Kitt Peak || Spacewatch || — || align=right data-sort-value="0.78" | 780 m || 
|-id=655 bgcolor=#d6d6d6
| 487655 ||  || — || June 27, 2015 || Haleakala || Pan-STARRS || — || align=right | 2.3 km || 
|-id=656 bgcolor=#d6d6d6
| 487656 ||  || — || May 9, 2014 || Haleakala || Pan-STARRS || — || align=right | 2.7 km || 
|-id=657 bgcolor=#E9E9E9
| 487657 ||  || — || September 15, 2007 || Catalina || CSS || MAR || align=right data-sort-value="0.94" | 940 m || 
|-id=658 bgcolor=#fefefe
| 487658 ||  || — || December 3, 2012 || Mount Lemmon || Mount Lemmon Survey || — || align=right data-sort-value="0.71" | 710 m || 
|-id=659 bgcolor=#fefefe
| 487659 ||  || — || September 9, 2008 || Mount Lemmon || Mount Lemmon Survey || — || align=right data-sort-value="0.68" | 680 m || 
|-id=660 bgcolor=#d6d6d6
| 487660 ||  || — || January 17, 2007 || Kitt Peak || Spacewatch || EOS || align=right | 2.1 km || 
|-id=661 bgcolor=#fefefe
| 487661 ||  || — || November 12, 2012 || Haleakala || Pan-STARRS || V || align=right data-sort-value="0.73" | 730 m || 
|-id=662 bgcolor=#d6d6d6
| 487662 ||  || — || January 26, 2012 || Haleakala || Pan-STARRS || — || align=right | 3.2 km || 
|-id=663 bgcolor=#E9E9E9
| 487663 ||  || — || January 16, 2013 || Mount Lemmon || Mount Lemmon Survey || — || align=right | 1.6 km || 
|-id=664 bgcolor=#fefefe
| 487664 ||  || — || September 24, 2008 || Mount Lemmon || Mount Lemmon Survey || V || align=right data-sort-value="0.68" | 680 m || 
|-id=665 bgcolor=#E9E9E9
| 487665 ||  || — || November 3, 2011 || Catalina || CSS || — || align=right | 1.9 km || 
|-id=666 bgcolor=#E9E9E9
| 487666 ||  || — || September 4, 2011 || Haleakala || Pan-STARRS || — || align=right data-sort-value="0.86" | 860 m || 
|-id=667 bgcolor=#E9E9E9
| 487667 ||  || — || November 2, 2011 || Mount Lemmon || Mount Lemmon Survey || — || align=right | 1.3 km || 
|-id=668 bgcolor=#d6d6d6
| 487668 ||  || — || December 27, 2006 || Kitt Peak || Spacewatch || — || align=right | 2.9 km || 
|-id=669 bgcolor=#fefefe
| 487669 ||  || — || January 19, 2004 || Kitt Peak || Spacewatch || — || align=right data-sort-value="0.58" | 580 m || 
|-id=670 bgcolor=#fefefe
| 487670 ||  || — || September 20, 2009 || Mount Lemmon || Mount Lemmon Survey || critical || align=right data-sort-value="0.62" | 620 m || 
|-id=671 bgcolor=#d6d6d6
| 487671 ||  || — || July 17, 2010 || WISE || WISE || — || align=right | 2.5 km || 
|-id=672 bgcolor=#E9E9E9
| 487672 ||  || — || January 18, 2009 || Kitt Peak || Spacewatch || — || align=right | 1.0 km || 
|-id=673 bgcolor=#fefefe
| 487673 ||  || — || October 22, 2012 || Haleakala || Pan-STARRS || — || align=right data-sort-value="0.65" | 650 m || 
|-id=674 bgcolor=#E9E9E9
| 487674 ||  || — || August 30, 2011 || Haleakala || Pan-STARRS || EUN || align=right data-sort-value="0.90" | 900 m || 
|-id=675 bgcolor=#fefefe
| 487675 ||  || — || October 8, 2012 || Haleakala || Pan-STARRS || — || align=right data-sort-value="0.71" | 710 m || 
|-id=676 bgcolor=#d6d6d6
| 487676 ||  || — || January 17, 2007 || Kitt Peak || Spacewatch || EOS || align=right | 1.5 km || 
|-id=677 bgcolor=#d6d6d6
| 487677 ||  || — || January 24, 2007 || Kitt Peak || Spacewatch || — || align=right | 2.3 km || 
|-id=678 bgcolor=#E9E9E9
| 487678 ||  || — || November 11, 2007 || Mount Lemmon || Mount Lemmon Survey || — || align=right | 2.5 km || 
|-id=679 bgcolor=#fefefe
| 487679 ||  || — || October 8, 2005 || Catalina || CSS || — || align=right data-sort-value="0.99" | 990 m || 
|-id=680 bgcolor=#fefefe
| 487680 ||  || — || February 9, 2013 || Haleakala || Pan-STARRS || — || align=right | 1.0 km || 
|-id=681 bgcolor=#fefefe
| 487681 ||  || — || July 3, 2011 || Mount Lemmon || Mount Lemmon Survey || MAS || align=right data-sort-value="0.81" | 810 m || 
|-id=682 bgcolor=#d6d6d6
| 487682 ||  || — || February 6, 2013 || Kitt Peak || Spacewatch || — || align=right | 2.5 km || 
|-id=683 bgcolor=#fefefe
| 487683 ||  || — || August 30, 2005 || Kitt Peak || Spacewatch || — || align=right data-sort-value="0.78" | 780 m || 
|-id=684 bgcolor=#fefefe
| 487684 ||  || — || February 16, 2010 || Mount Lemmon || Mount Lemmon Survey || — || align=right data-sort-value="0.92" | 920 m || 
|-id=685 bgcolor=#E9E9E9
| 487685 ||  || — || November 3, 2007 || Catalina || CSS || EUN || align=right | 1.2 km || 
|-id=686 bgcolor=#E9E9E9
| 487686 ||  || — || October 23, 2011 || Haleakala || Pan-STARRS || — || align=right | 2.3 km || 
|-id=687 bgcolor=#d6d6d6
| 487687 ||  || — || October 15, 2009 || Mount Lemmon || Mount Lemmon Survey || — || align=right | 4.2 km || 
|-id=688 bgcolor=#fefefe
| 487688 ||  || — || August 8, 2004 || Socorro || LINEAR || V || align=right data-sort-value="0.74" | 740 m || 
|-id=689 bgcolor=#E9E9E9
| 487689 ||  || — || October 24, 2011 || Haleakala || Pan-STARRS || — || align=right | 1.6 km || 
|-id=690 bgcolor=#fefefe
| 487690 ||  || — || November 19, 2008 || Kitt Peak || Spacewatch || V || align=right data-sort-value="0.57" | 570 m || 
|-id=691 bgcolor=#d6d6d6
| 487691 ||  || — || May 8, 2014 || Kitt Peak || Spacewatch || — || align=right | 3.1 km || 
|-id=692 bgcolor=#d6d6d6
| 487692 ||  || — || September 9, 2004 || Socorro || LINEAR || — || align=right | 2.7 km || 
|-id=693 bgcolor=#d6d6d6
| 487693 ||  || — || August 12, 2010 || WISE || WISE || Tj (2.93) || align=right | 3.1 km || 
|-id=694 bgcolor=#fefefe
| 487694 ||  || — || January 2, 2014 || Mount Lemmon || Mount Lemmon Survey || H || align=right data-sort-value="0.51" | 510 m || 
|-id=695 bgcolor=#fefefe
| 487695 ||  || — || September 14, 2007 || Catalina || CSS || H || align=right data-sort-value="0.67" | 670 m || 
|-id=696 bgcolor=#d6d6d6
| 487696 ||  || — || September 17, 2004 || Kitt Peak || Spacewatch || EOS || align=right | 2.0 km || 
|-id=697 bgcolor=#fefefe
| 487697 ||  || — || July 14, 2015 || Haleakala || Pan-STARRS || — || align=right data-sort-value="0.70" | 700 m || 
|-id=698 bgcolor=#E9E9E9
| 487698 ||  || — || October 25, 2011 || Haleakala || Pan-STARRS || EUN || align=right | 1.0 km || 
|-id=699 bgcolor=#E9E9E9
| 487699 ||  || — || September 14, 2007 || Mount Lemmon || Mount Lemmon Survey || KON || align=right | 2.0 km || 
|-id=700 bgcolor=#E9E9E9
| 487700 ||  || — || September 21, 2011 || Kitt Peak || Spacewatch || — || align=right | 1.5 km || 
|}

487701–487800 

|-bgcolor=#fefefe
| 487701 ||  || — || October 23, 2012 || Haleakala || Pan-STARRS || — || align=right data-sort-value="0.80" | 800 m || 
|-id=702 bgcolor=#fefefe
| 487702 ||  || — || August 29, 2008 || La Sagra || OAM Obs. || — || align=right data-sort-value="0.87" | 870 m || 
|-id=703 bgcolor=#E9E9E9
| 487703 ||  || — || January 18, 2008 || Mount Lemmon || Mount Lemmon Survey || — || align=right | 2.3 km || 
|-id=704 bgcolor=#d6d6d6
| 487704 ||  || — || January 25, 2012 || Haleakala || Pan-STARRS || — || align=right | 2.0 km || 
|-id=705 bgcolor=#fefefe
| 487705 ||  || — || August 28, 2011 || Haleakala || Pan-STARRS || — || align=right data-sort-value="0.87" | 870 m || 
|-id=706 bgcolor=#fefefe
| 487706 ||  || — || September 24, 2000 || Kitt Peak || Spacewatch || — || align=right data-sort-value="0.85" | 850 m || 
|-id=707 bgcolor=#d6d6d6
| 487707 ||  || — || November 3, 2004 || Anderson Mesa || LONEOS || — || align=right | 3.1 km || 
|-id=708 bgcolor=#E9E9E9
| 487708 ||  || — || December 24, 2011 || Mount Lemmon || Mount Lemmon Survey || — || align=right | 2.2 km || 
|-id=709 bgcolor=#d6d6d6
| 487709 ||  || — || September 14, 1998 || Socorro || LINEAR || THB || align=right | 3.2 km || 
|-id=710 bgcolor=#fefefe
| 487710 ||  || — || September 26, 2008 || Kitt Peak || Spacewatch || — || align=right data-sort-value="0.65" | 650 m || 
|-id=711 bgcolor=#E9E9E9
| 487711 ||  || — || September 13, 2007 || Kitt Peak || Spacewatch || — || align=right data-sort-value="0.70" | 700 m || 
|-id=712 bgcolor=#fefefe
| 487712 ||  || — || November 19, 2009 || Kitt Peak || Spacewatch || — || align=right data-sort-value="0.72" | 720 m || 
|-id=713 bgcolor=#E9E9E9
| 487713 ||  || — || March 5, 2013 || Haleakala || Pan-STARRS || (5) || align=right data-sort-value="0.92" | 920 m || 
|-id=714 bgcolor=#E9E9E9
| 487714 ||  || — || November 8, 2007 || Kitt Peak || Spacewatch || — || align=right | 1.1 km || 
|-id=715 bgcolor=#fefefe
| 487715 ||  || — || September 5, 2008 || Kitt Peak || Spacewatch || — || align=right data-sort-value="0.94" | 940 m || 
|-id=716 bgcolor=#fefefe
| 487716 ||  || — || August 23, 2007 || Kitt Peak || Spacewatch || — || align=right data-sort-value="0.78" | 780 m || 
|-id=717 bgcolor=#d6d6d6
| 487717 ||  || — || February 8, 2008 || Kitt Peak || Spacewatch || — || align=right | 2.4 km || 
|-id=718 bgcolor=#fefefe
| 487718 ||  || — || October 7, 2012 || Kitt Peak || Spacewatch || — || align=right data-sort-value="0.79" | 790 m || 
|-id=719 bgcolor=#fefefe
| 487719 ||  || — || April 8, 2002 || Kitt Peak || Spacewatch || MAS || align=right data-sort-value="0.73" | 730 m || 
|-id=720 bgcolor=#d6d6d6
| 487720 ||  || — || July 28, 2010 || WISE || WISE || — || align=right | 3.0 km || 
|-id=721 bgcolor=#d6d6d6
| 487721 ||  || — || September 9, 2004 || Kitt Peak || Spacewatch || LIX || align=right | 2.9 km || 
|-id=722 bgcolor=#E9E9E9
| 487722 ||  || — || November 23, 2011 || Mount Lemmon || Mount Lemmon Survey || — || align=right | 1.9 km || 
|-id=723 bgcolor=#fefefe
| 487723 ||  || — || August 24, 2011 || Haleakala || Pan-STARRS || NYS || align=right data-sort-value="0.69" | 690 m || 
|-id=724 bgcolor=#d6d6d6
| 487724 ||  || — || December 10, 2005 || Kitt Peak || Spacewatch || — || align=right | 2.7 km || 
|-id=725 bgcolor=#d6d6d6
| 487725 ||  || — || October 17, 2010 || Catalina || CSS || — || align=right | 2.9 km || 
|-id=726 bgcolor=#fefefe
| 487726 ||  || — || March 19, 2010 || Mount Lemmon || Mount Lemmon Survey || — || align=right data-sort-value="0.80" | 800 m || 
|-id=727 bgcolor=#fefefe
| 487727 ||  || — || March 10, 2002 || Cima Ekar || ADAS || — || align=right data-sort-value="0.88" | 880 m || 
|-id=728 bgcolor=#fefefe
| 487728 ||  || — || November 7, 2012 || Kitt Peak || Spacewatch || — || align=right data-sort-value="0.71" | 710 m || 
|-id=729 bgcolor=#d6d6d6
| 487729 ||  || — || September 7, 2004 || Kitt Peak || Spacewatch || — || align=right | 2.2 km || 
|-id=730 bgcolor=#fefefe
| 487730 ||  || — || December 5, 2005 || Socorro || LINEAR || — || align=right data-sort-value="0.94" | 940 m || 
|-id=731 bgcolor=#E9E9E9
| 487731 ||  || — || August 28, 2006 || Catalina || CSS || — || align=right | 1.9 km || 
|-id=732 bgcolor=#fefefe
| 487732 ||  || — || April 22, 2007 || Kitt Peak || Spacewatch || MAS || align=right data-sort-value="0.71" | 710 m || 
|-id=733 bgcolor=#E9E9E9
| 487733 ||  || — || July 1, 2011 || Haleakala || Pan-STARRS || MAR || align=right | 1.2 km || 
|-id=734 bgcolor=#fefefe
| 487734 ||  || — || August 25, 2011 || La Sagra || OAM Obs. || MAS || align=right data-sort-value="0.77" | 770 m || 
|-id=735 bgcolor=#E9E9E9
| 487735 ||  || — || October 27, 2011 || Catalina || CSS || — || align=right data-sort-value="0.90" | 900 m || 
|-id=736 bgcolor=#fefefe
| 487736 ||  || — || July 2, 2011 || Mount Lemmon || Mount Lemmon Survey || — || align=right data-sort-value="0.85" | 850 m || 
|-id=737 bgcolor=#E9E9E9
| 487737 ||  || — || November 14, 2007 || Kitt Peak || Spacewatch || — || align=right | 1.2 km || 
|-id=738 bgcolor=#fefefe
| 487738 ||  || — || November 12, 2005 || Kitt Peak || Spacewatch || — || align=right data-sort-value="0.86" | 860 m || 
|-id=739 bgcolor=#d6d6d6
| 487739 ||  || — || December 28, 2005 || Mount Lemmon || Mount Lemmon Survey || — || align=right | 1.9 km || 
|-id=740 bgcolor=#FA8072
| 487740 ||  || — || October 13, 1993 || Kitt Peak || Spacewatch || — || align=right data-sort-value="0.62" | 620 m || 
|-id=741 bgcolor=#E9E9E9
| 487741 ||  || — || April 5, 2000 || Socorro || LINEAR || — || align=right | 2.3 km || 
|-id=742 bgcolor=#fefefe
| 487742 ||  || — || May 11, 2010 || Kitt Peak || Spacewatch || — || align=right data-sort-value="0.92" | 920 m || 
|-id=743 bgcolor=#d6d6d6
| 487743 ||  || — || April 13, 2013 || Haleakala || Pan-STARRS || — || align=right | 3.4 km || 
|-id=744 bgcolor=#E9E9E9
| 487744 ||  || — || February 21, 2009 || Kitt Peak || Spacewatch || — || align=right data-sort-value="0.76" | 760 m || 
|-id=745 bgcolor=#fefefe
| 487745 ||  || — || January 9, 2013 || Kitt Peak || Spacewatch || MAS || align=right data-sort-value="0.71" | 710 m || 
|-id=746 bgcolor=#fefefe
| 487746 ||  || — || November 10, 2004 || Kitt Peak || Spacewatch || — || align=right | 1.1 km || 
|-id=747 bgcolor=#d6d6d6
| 487747 ||  || — || October 9, 2004 || Anderson Mesa || LONEOS || — || align=right | 3.4 km || 
|-id=748 bgcolor=#fefefe
| 487748 ||  || — || February 15, 2010 || Kitt Peak || Spacewatch || — || align=right data-sort-value="0.83" | 830 m || 
|-id=749 bgcolor=#fefefe
| 487749 ||  || — || September 7, 2011 || Siding Spring || SSS || — || align=right | 1.1 km || 
|-id=750 bgcolor=#E9E9E9
| 487750 ||  || — || June 2, 2014 || Haleakala || Pan-STARRS || EUN || align=right | 1.2 km || 
|-id=751 bgcolor=#E9E9E9
| 487751 ||  || — || May 30, 2015 || Haleakala || Pan-STARRS || — || align=right | 2.6 km || 
|-id=752 bgcolor=#E9E9E9
| 487752 ||  || — || September 12, 2007 || Catalina || CSS || — || align=right data-sort-value="0.86" | 860 m || 
|-id=753 bgcolor=#E9E9E9
| 487753 ||  || — || October 16, 2011 || Kitt Peak || Spacewatch || — || align=right | 1.4 km || 
|-id=754 bgcolor=#fefefe
| 487754 ||  || — || April 4, 2014 || Mount Lemmon || Mount Lemmon Survey || — || align=right data-sort-value="0.59" | 590 m || 
|-id=755 bgcolor=#E9E9E9
| 487755 ||  || — || March 8, 2013 || Haleakala || Pan-STARRS || — || align=right | 1.3 km || 
|-id=756 bgcolor=#fefefe
| 487756 ||  || — || February 15, 2010 || Kitt Peak || Spacewatch || — || align=right data-sort-value="0.75" | 750 m || 
|-id=757 bgcolor=#E9E9E9
| 487757 ||  || — || October 24, 2011 || Kitt Peak || Spacewatch || — || align=right | 1.3 km || 
|-id=758 bgcolor=#d6d6d6
| 487758 ||  || — || October 6, 2004 || Kitt Peak || Spacewatch || — || align=right | 2.6 km || 
|-id=759 bgcolor=#d6d6d6
| 487759 ||  || — || September 12, 2010 || Kitt Peak || Spacewatch || KOR || align=right | 1.3 km || 
|-id=760 bgcolor=#fefefe
| 487760 ||  || — || July 29, 2008 || Kitt Peak || Spacewatch || — || align=right data-sort-value="0.56" | 560 m || 
|-id=761 bgcolor=#E9E9E9
| 487761 Frankbrandner ||  ||  || October 26, 2011 || Haleakala || Pan-STARRS || — || align=right | 1.2 km || 
|-id=762 bgcolor=#d6d6d6
| 487762 ||  || — || October 30, 2010 || Mount Lemmon || Mount Lemmon Survey || — || align=right | 2.8 km || 
|-id=763 bgcolor=#E9E9E9
| 487763 ||  || — || October 1, 2011 || Kitt Peak || Spacewatch || — || align=right | 1.2 km || 
|-id=764 bgcolor=#d6d6d6
| 487764 ||  || — || November 11, 2010 || Mount Lemmon || Mount Lemmon Survey || — || align=right | 1.9 km || 
|-id=765 bgcolor=#fefefe
| 487765 ||  || — || February 28, 2014 || Haleakala || Pan-STARRS || MAS || align=right data-sort-value="0.63" | 630 m || 
|-id=766 bgcolor=#d6d6d6
| 487766 ||  || — || October 7, 2004 || Kitt Peak || Spacewatch || — || align=right | 2.5 km || 
|-id=767 bgcolor=#d6d6d6
| 487767 ||  || — || April 1, 2013 || Kitt Peak || Spacewatch || — || align=right | 2.1 km || 
|-id=768 bgcolor=#E9E9E9
| 487768 ||  || — || October 18, 2006 || Kitt Peak || Spacewatch || HOF || align=right | 2.6 km || 
|-id=769 bgcolor=#d6d6d6
| 487769 ||  || — || April 10, 2013 || Haleakala || Pan-STARRS || KOR || align=right | 1.2 km || 
|-id=770 bgcolor=#d6d6d6
| 487770 ||  || — || August 10, 2004 || Socorro || LINEAR || — || align=right | 2.6 km || 
|-id=771 bgcolor=#fefefe
| 487771 ||  || — || July 22, 2011 || Haleakala || Pan-STARRS || — || align=right | 1.1 km || 
|-id=772 bgcolor=#E9E9E9
| 487772 ||  || — || October 26, 2011 || Haleakala || Pan-STARRS || — || align=right | 1.6 km || 
|-id=773 bgcolor=#d6d6d6
| 487773 ||  || — || October 6, 2004 || Kitt Peak || Spacewatch || — || align=right | 2.5 km || 
|-id=774 bgcolor=#fefefe
| 487774 ||  || — || August 28, 2005 || Kitt Peak || Spacewatch || critical || align=right data-sort-value="0.71" | 710 m || 
|-id=775 bgcolor=#fefefe
| 487775 ||  || — || January 19, 2013 || Mount Lemmon || Mount Lemmon Survey || — || align=right data-sort-value="0.73" | 730 m || 
|-id=776 bgcolor=#d6d6d6
| 487776 ||  || — || September 12, 2004 || Kitt Peak || Spacewatch || — || align=right | 2.2 km || 
|-id=777 bgcolor=#E9E9E9
| 487777 ||  || — || April 29, 2010 || WISE || WISE || — || align=right | 2.4 km || 
|-id=778 bgcolor=#E9E9E9
| 487778 ||  || — || August 27, 2006 || Kitt Peak || Spacewatch || — || align=right | 1.4 km || 
|-id=779 bgcolor=#d6d6d6
| 487779 ||  || — || October 4, 2004 || Kitt Peak || Spacewatch || — || align=right | 2.0 km || 
|-id=780 bgcolor=#d6d6d6
| 487780 ||  || — || October 12, 2010 || Mount Lemmon || Mount Lemmon Survey || — || align=right | 2.2 km || 
|-id=781 bgcolor=#d6d6d6
| 487781 ||  || — || December 14, 2004 || Kitt Peak || Spacewatch || — || align=right | 2.4 km || 
|-id=782 bgcolor=#d6d6d6
| 487782 ||  || — || July 30, 2014 || Haleakala || Pan-STARRS || — || align=right | 2.3 km || 
|-id=783 bgcolor=#E9E9E9
| 487783 ||  || — || October 12, 2007 || Mount Lemmon || Mount Lemmon Survey || — || align=right data-sort-value="0.72" | 720 m || 
|-id=784 bgcolor=#d6d6d6
| 487784 ||  || — || October 7, 2004 || Kitt Peak || Spacewatch || — || align=right | 2.0 km || 
|-id=785 bgcolor=#d6d6d6
| 487785 ||  || — || December 28, 2005 || Kitt Peak || Spacewatch || critical || align=right | 1.6 km || 
|-id=786 bgcolor=#E9E9E9
| 487786 ||  || — || April 7, 2005 || Kitt Peak || Spacewatch || (5) || align=right data-sort-value="0.76" | 760 m || 
|-id=787 bgcolor=#E9E9E9
| 487787 ||  || — || March 22, 2009 || Catalina || CSS || EUN || align=right | 1.3 km || 
|-id=788 bgcolor=#d6d6d6
| 487788 ||  || — || January 7, 2006 || Mount Lemmon || Mount Lemmon Survey || — || align=right | 2.7 km || 
|-id=789 bgcolor=#E9E9E9
| 487789 ||  || — || February 26, 2004 || Socorro || LINEAR || EUN || align=right | 1.3 km || 
|-id=790 bgcolor=#d6d6d6
| 487790 ||  || — || March 12, 2007 || Mount Lemmon || Mount Lemmon Survey || — || align=right | 2.6 km || 
|-id=791 bgcolor=#d6d6d6
| 487791 ||  || — || December 27, 2005 || Kitt Peak || Spacewatch || EOS || align=right | 1.5 km || 
|-id=792 bgcolor=#E9E9E9
| 487792 ||  || — || October 15, 2007 || Mount Lemmon || Mount Lemmon Survey || — || align=right | 1.7 km || 
|-id=793 bgcolor=#d6d6d6
| 487793 ||  || — || June 28, 2014 || Haleakala || Pan-STARRS || — || align=right | 3.7 km || 
|-id=794 bgcolor=#E9E9E9
| 487794 ||  || — || February 8, 2013 || Haleakala || Pan-STARRS || MAR || align=right | 1.1 km || 
|-id=795 bgcolor=#d6d6d6
| 487795 ||  || — || July 29, 2014 || Haleakala || Pan-STARRS || — || align=right | 2.6 km || 
|-id=796 bgcolor=#d6d6d6
| 487796 ||  || — || September 14, 2005 || Kitt Peak || Spacewatch || — || align=right | 2.2 km || 
|-id=797 bgcolor=#d6d6d6
| 487797 ||  || — || February 14, 2013 || Haleakala || Pan-STARRS || — || align=right | 4.0 km || 
|-id=798 bgcolor=#fefefe
| 487798 ||  || — || March 16, 2007 || Mount Lemmon || Mount Lemmon Survey || — || align=right data-sort-value="0.82" | 820 m || 
|-id=799 bgcolor=#fefefe
| 487799 ||  || — || October 22, 2005 || Kitt Peak || Spacewatch || — || align=right data-sort-value="0.90" | 900 m || 
|-id=800 bgcolor=#E9E9E9
| 487800 ||  || — || January 16, 2013 || Mount Lemmon || Mount Lemmon Survey || — || align=right | 4.1 km || 
|}

487801–487900 

|-bgcolor=#fefefe
| 487801 ||  || — || November 30, 2005 || Kitt Peak || Spacewatch || V || align=right data-sort-value="0.60" | 600 m || 
|-id=802 bgcolor=#fefefe
| 487802 ||  || — || August 23, 2011 || La Sagra || OAM Obs. || — || align=right | 1.1 km || 
|-id=803 bgcolor=#d6d6d6
| 487803 ||  || — || September 25, 2009 || Mount Lemmon || Mount Lemmon Survey || — || align=right | 2.7 km || 
|-id=804 bgcolor=#d6d6d6
| 487804 ||  || — || October 9, 2004 || Kitt Peak || Spacewatch || LIX || align=right | 2.6 km || 
|-id=805 bgcolor=#d6d6d6
| 487805 ||  || — || September 12, 2004 || Kitt Peak || Spacewatch || — || align=right | 2.5 km || 
|-id=806 bgcolor=#E9E9E9
| 487806 ||  || — || October 17, 2006 || Catalina || CSS || AGN || align=right | 1.1 km || 
|-id=807 bgcolor=#E9E9E9
| 487807 ||  || — || October 23, 2011 || Kitt Peak || Spacewatch || — || align=right | 2.1 km || 
|-id=808 bgcolor=#fefefe
| 487808 ||  || — || December 29, 2008 || Mount Lemmon || Mount Lemmon Survey || V || align=right data-sort-value="0.70" | 700 m || 
|-id=809 bgcolor=#fefefe
| 487809 ||  || — || February 10, 2010 || Kitt Peak || Spacewatch || V || align=right data-sort-value="0.62" | 620 m || 
|-id=810 bgcolor=#d6d6d6
| 487810 ||  || — || December 15, 2010 || Mount Lemmon || Mount Lemmon Survey || — || align=right | 2.0 km || 
|-id=811 bgcolor=#fefefe
| 487811 ||  || — || September 3, 2010 || Mount Lemmon || Mount Lemmon Survey || H || align=right data-sort-value="0.63" | 630 m || 
|-id=812 bgcolor=#fefefe
| 487812 ||  || — || July 28, 2011 || Haleakala || Pan-STARRS || — || align=right data-sort-value="0.96" | 960 m || 
|-id=813 bgcolor=#E9E9E9
| 487813 ||  || — || November 3, 2011 || Catalina || CSS || — || align=right | 1.4 km || 
|-id=814 bgcolor=#E9E9E9
| 487814 ||  || — || March 29, 2009 || Kitt Peak || Spacewatch || — || align=right | 1.1 km || 
|-id=815 bgcolor=#d6d6d6
| 487815 ||  || — || September 15, 2010 || Kitt Peak || Spacewatch || — || align=right | 2.6 km || 
|-id=816 bgcolor=#d6d6d6
| 487816 ||  || — || October 24, 1998 || Kitt Peak || Spacewatch || LIX || align=right | 3.5 km || 
|-id=817 bgcolor=#E9E9E9
| 487817 ||  || — || April 19, 2009 || Mount Lemmon || Mount Lemmon Survey || — || align=right | 1.6 km || 
|-id=818 bgcolor=#fefefe
| 487818 ||  || — || March 5, 2014 || Haleakala || Pan-STARRS || MAS || align=right | 1.2 km || 
|-id=819 bgcolor=#E9E9E9
| 487819 ||  || — || October 17, 2007 || Catalina || CSS || — || align=right | 1.2 km || 
|-id=820 bgcolor=#E9E9E9
| 487820 ||  || — || August 28, 2006 || Kitt Peak || Spacewatch || — || align=right | 1.7 km || 
|-id=821 bgcolor=#E9E9E9
| 487821 ||  || — || September 16, 2001 || Socorro || LINEAR || — || align=right | 2.3 km || 
|-id=822 bgcolor=#fefefe
| 487822 ||  || — || September 4, 2011 || Haleakala || Pan-STARRS || V || align=right data-sort-value="0.72" | 720 m || 
|-id=823 bgcolor=#E9E9E9
| 487823 ||  || — || April 16, 2004 || Kitt Peak || Spacewatch || — || align=right | 1.4 km || 
|-id=824 bgcolor=#E9E9E9
| 487824 ||  || — || April 11, 2005 || Kitt Peak || Spacewatch || — || align=right | 1.8 km || 
|-id=825 bgcolor=#d6d6d6
| 487825 ||  || — || December 22, 2005 || Kitt Peak || Spacewatch || — || align=right | 2.2 km || 
|-id=826 bgcolor=#d6d6d6
| 487826 ||  || — || December 15, 2004 || Kitt Peak || Spacewatch || — || align=right | 2.3 km || 
|-id=827 bgcolor=#E9E9E9
| 487827 ||  || — || May 23, 2010 || WISE || WISE || — || align=right | 2.6 km || 
|-id=828 bgcolor=#d6d6d6
| 487828 ||  || — || September 17, 2009 || Kitt Peak || Spacewatch || VER || align=right | 2.4 km || 
|-id=829 bgcolor=#d6d6d6
| 487829 ||  || — || April 10, 2013 || Haleakala || Pan-STARRS || — || align=right | 2.8 km || 
|-id=830 bgcolor=#d6d6d6
| 487830 ||  || — || November 8, 2010 || Kitt Peak || Spacewatch || — || align=right | 2.5 km || 
|-id=831 bgcolor=#d6d6d6
| 487831 ||  || — || September 18, 2009 || Kitt Peak || Spacewatch || — || align=right | 3.0 km || 
|-id=832 bgcolor=#d6d6d6
| 487832 ||  || — || October 9, 2004 || Kitt Peak || Spacewatch || — || align=right | 2.3 km || 
|-id=833 bgcolor=#E9E9E9
| 487833 ||  || — || November 19, 2006 || Kitt Peak || Spacewatch || — || align=right | 1.6 km || 
|-id=834 bgcolor=#E9E9E9
| 487834 ||  || — || March 5, 2008 || Mount Lemmon || Mount Lemmon Survey || AGN || align=right | 1.2 km || 
|-id=835 bgcolor=#d6d6d6
| 487835 ||  || — || September 16, 2009 || Kitt Peak || Spacewatch || — || align=right | 2.2 km || 
|-id=836 bgcolor=#d6d6d6
| 487836 ||  || — || October 12, 1993 || Kitt Peak || Spacewatch || — || align=right | 2.8 km || 
|-id=837 bgcolor=#fefefe
| 487837 ||  || — || October 15, 2004 || Mount Lemmon || Mount Lemmon Survey || — || align=right | 1.1 km || 
|-id=838 bgcolor=#d6d6d6
| 487838 ||  || — || April 19, 2012 || Mount Lemmon || Mount Lemmon Survey || — || align=right | 2.8 km || 
|-id=839 bgcolor=#d6d6d6
| 487839 ||  || — || October 24, 2009 || Kitt Peak || Spacewatch || — || align=right | 2.7 km || 
|-id=840 bgcolor=#d6d6d6
| 487840 ||  || — || February 11, 2012 || Mount Lemmon || Mount Lemmon Survey || KOR || align=right | 1.4 km || 
|-id=841 bgcolor=#d6d6d6
| 487841 ||  || — || September 18, 1995 || Kitt Peak || Spacewatch || KOR || align=right | 1.1 km || 
|-id=842 bgcolor=#d6d6d6
| 487842 ||  || — || November 2, 1999 || Kitt Peak || Spacewatch || — || align=right | 2.6 km || 
|-id=843 bgcolor=#d6d6d6
| 487843 ||  || — || June 27, 2014 || Haleakala || Pan-STARRS || — || align=right | 2.8 km || 
|-id=844 bgcolor=#E9E9E9
| 487844 ||  || — || October 18, 2011 || Kitt Peak || Spacewatch || — || align=right data-sort-value="0.87" | 870 m || 
|-id=845 bgcolor=#d6d6d6
| 487845 ||  || — || September 17, 2009 || Mount Lemmon || Mount Lemmon Survey || EOScritical || align=right | 1.5 km || 
|-id=846 bgcolor=#fefefe
| 487846 ||  || — || January 8, 2010 || Mount Lemmon || Mount Lemmon Survey || — || align=right data-sort-value="0.78" | 780 m || 
|-id=847 bgcolor=#d6d6d6
| 487847 ||  || — || July 1, 2014 || Haleakala || Pan-STARRS || — || align=right | 2.9 km || 
|-id=848 bgcolor=#d6d6d6
| 487848 ||  || — || November 19, 2009 || Kitt Peak || Spacewatch || 7:4 || align=right | 2.7 km || 
|-id=849 bgcolor=#d6d6d6
| 487849 ||  || — || February 4, 2006 || Mount Lemmon || Mount Lemmon Survey || — || align=right | 2.5 km || 
|-id=850 bgcolor=#fefefe
| 487850 ||  || — || March 31, 2003 || Kitt Peak || Spacewatch || — || align=right data-sort-value="0.89" | 890 m || 
|-id=851 bgcolor=#d6d6d6
| 487851 ||  || — || April 19, 2013 || Haleakala || Pan-STARRS || — || align=right | 2.2 km || 
|-id=852 bgcolor=#fefefe
| 487852 ||  || — || July 24, 2011 || La Sagra || OAM Obs. || — || align=right data-sort-value="0.94" | 940 m || 
|-id=853 bgcolor=#d6d6d6
| 487853 ||  || — || September 11, 2004 || Kitt Peak || Spacewatch || EOS || align=right | 1.5 km || 
|-id=854 bgcolor=#d6d6d6
| 487854 ||  || — || September 11, 2004 || Kitt Peak || Spacewatch || TEL || align=right | 1.1 km || 
|-id=855 bgcolor=#d6d6d6
| 487855 ||  || — || January 25, 2012 || Kitt Peak || Spacewatch || — || align=right | 3.1 km || 
|-id=856 bgcolor=#d6d6d6
| 487856 ||  || — || September 27, 2009 || Kitt Peak || Spacewatch || EOS || align=right | 1.9 km || 
|-id=857 bgcolor=#d6d6d6
| 487857 ||  || — || June 7, 2013 || Haleakala || Pan-STARRS || — || align=right | 2.7 km || 
|-id=858 bgcolor=#d6d6d6
| 487858 ||  || — || August 28, 2009 || Kitt Peak || Spacewatch || — || align=right | 2.1 km || 
|-id=859 bgcolor=#d6d6d6
| 487859 ||  || — || March 16, 2012 || Haleakala || Pan-STARRS || — || align=right | 3.2 km || 
|-id=860 bgcolor=#d6d6d6
| 487860 ||  || — || February 21, 2006 || Mount Lemmon || Mount Lemmon Survey || — || align=right | 3.1 km || 
|-id=861 bgcolor=#E9E9E9
| 487861 ||  || — || March 4, 2005 || Mount Lemmon || Mount Lemmon Survey || — || align=right | 1.3 km || 
|-id=862 bgcolor=#d6d6d6
| 487862 ||  || — || April 29, 2008 || Mount Lemmon || Mount Lemmon Survey || — || align=right | 2.4 km || 
|-id=863 bgcolor=#fefefe
| 487863 ||  || — || September 18, 2011 || Mount Lemmon || Mount Lemmon Survey || V || align=right data-sort-value="0.54" | 540 m || 
|-id=864 bgcolor=#fefefe
| 487864 ||  || — || September 25, 2011 || Haleakala || Pan-STARRS || — || align=right data-sort-value="0.90" | 900 m || 
|-id=865 bgcolor=#E9E9E9
| 487865 ||  || — || February 8, 2008 || Kitt Peak || Spacewatch || — || align=right | 1.5 km || 
|-id=866 bgcolor=#d6d6d6
| 487866 ||  || — || May 5, 2008 || Kitt Peak || Spacewatch || — || align=right | 3.4 km || 
|-id=867 bgcolor=#d6d6d6
| 487867 ||  || — || July 29, 2014 || Haleakala || Pan-STARRS || — || align=right | 2.9 km || 
|-id=868 bgcolor=#fefefe
| 487868 ||  || — || August 24, 2011 || Haleakala || Pan-STARRS || V || align=right data-sort-value="0.54" | 540 m || 
|-id=869 bgcolor=#d6d6d6
| 487869 ||  || — || July 1, 2014 || Haleakala || Pan-STARRS || — || align=right | 2.1 km || 
|-id=870 bgcolor=#d6d6d6
| 487870 ||  || — || December 25, 2005 || Kitt Peak || Spacewatch || EOS || align=right | 1.7 km || 
|-id=871 bgcolor=#d6d6d6
| 487871 ||  || — || December 3, 2010 || Kitt Peak || Spacewatch || — || align=right | 2.9 km || 
|-id=872 bgcolor=#E9E9E9
| 487872 ||  || — || November 25, 2011 || Haleakala || Pan-STARRS || — || align=right | 3.1 km || 
|-id=873 bgcolor=#d6d6d6
| 487873 ||  || — || February 16, 2012 || Haleakala || Pan-STARRS || — || align=right | 2.4 km || 
|-id=874 bgcolor=#d6d6d6
| 487874 ||  || — || July 27, 2014 || Haleakala || Pan-STARRS || — || align=right | 2.6 km || 
|-id=875 bgcolor=#E9E9E9
| 487875 ||  || — || December 24, 2011 || Mount Lemmon || Mount Lemmon Survey || — || align=right | 1.9 km || 
|-id=876 bgcolor=#d6d6d6
| 487876 ||  || — || May 8, 2013 || Haleakala || Pan-STARRS || — || align=right | 2.8 km || 
|-id=877 bgcolor=#E9E9E9
| 487877 ||  || — || December 15, 2007 || Mount Lemmon || Mount Lemmon Survey || — || align=right | 1.4 km || 
|-id=878 bgcolor=#E9E9E9
| 487878 ||  || — || July 8, 2014 || Haleakala || Pan-STARRS || GEF || align=right | 1.1 km || 
|-id=879 bgcolor=#d6d6d6
| 487879 ||  || — || January 9, 2011 || Kitt Peak || Spacewatch || — || align=right | 3.5 km || 
|-id=880 bgcolor=#E9E9E9
| 487880 ||  || — || September 11, 2015 || Haleakala || Pan-STARRS || — || align=right | 1.0 km || 
|-id=881 bgcolor=#E9E9E9
| 487881 ||  || — || November 16, 2011 || Kitt Peak || Spacewatch || — || align=right | 1.7 km || 
|-id=882 bgcolor=#d6d6d6
| 487882 ||  || — || February 21, 2007 || Kitt Peak || Spacewatch || — || align=right | 2.7 km || 
|-id=883 bgcolor=#E9E9E9
| 487883 ||  || — || April 20, 2004 || Socorro || LINEAR || — || align=right | 1.5 km || 
|-id=884 bgcolor=#d6d6d6
| 487884 ||  || — || January 19, 2012 || Haleakala || Pan-STARRS || — || align=right | 2.9 km || 
|-id=885 bgcolor=#d6d6d6
| 487885 ||  || — || January 2, 2012 || Mount Lemmon || Mount Lemmon Survey || — || align=right | 4.5 km || 
|-id=886 bgcolor=#E9E9E9
| 487886 ||  || — || October 4, 2006 || Mount Lemmon || Mount Lemmon Survey || — || align=right | 2.1 km || 
|-id=887 bgcolor=#E9E9E9
| 487887 ||  || — || February 15, 2013 || Haleakala || Pan-STARRS || — || align=right | 1.4 km || 
|-id=888 bgcolor=#fefefe
| 487888 ||  || — || January 8, 2013 || Mount Lemmon || Mount Lemmon Survey || — || align=right data-sort-value="0.91" | 910 m || 
|-id=889 bgcolor=#E9E9E9
| 487889 ||  || — || November 27, 2011 || Catalina || CSS || — || align=right | 1.7 km || 
|-id=890 bgcolor=#E9E9E9
| 487890 ||  || — || September 27, 2006 || Kitt Peak || Spacewatch || — || align=right | 2.0 km || 
|-id=891 bgcolor=#E9E9E9
| 487891 ||  || — || March 31, 2009 || Mount Lemmon || Mount Lemmon Survey || — || align=right | 1.3 km || 
|-id=892 bgcolor=#E9E9E9
| 487892 ||  || — || October 30, 2011 || Kitt Peak || Spacewatch || — || align=right | 1.1 km || 
|-id=893 bgcolor=#fefefe
| 487893 ||  || — || October 26, 2008 || Kitt Peak || Spacewatch || — || align=right data-sort-value="0.67" | 670 m || 
|-id=894 bgcolor=#fefefe
| 487894 ||  || — || September 3, 2008 || Kitt Peak || Spacewatch || V || align=right data-sort-value="0.65" | 650 m || 
|-id=895 bgcolor=#E9E9E9
| 487895 ||  || — || September 27, 2003 || Kitt Peak || Spacewatch || — || align=right data-sort-value="0.96" | 960 m || 
|-id=896 bgcolor=#fefefe
| 487896 ||  || — || May 30, 2008 || Mount Lemmon || Mount Lemmon Survey || — || align=right data-sort-value="0.70" | 700 m || 
|-id=897 bgcolor=#FA8072
| 487897 ||  || — || August 24, 1998 || Socorro || LINEAR || — || align=right data-sort-value="0.86" | 860 m || 
|-id=898 bgcolor=#E9E9E9
| 487898 ||  || — || October 2, 2006 || Mount Lemmon || Mount Lemmon Survey || — || align=right | 2.5 km || 
|-id=899 bgcolor=#E9E9E9
| 487899 ||  || — || February 8, 2008 || Mount Lemmon || Mount Lemmon Survey || — || align=right | 1.7 km || 
|-id=900 bgcolor=#E9E9E9
| 487900 ||  || — || March 8, 2013 || Haleakala || Pan-STARRS || — || align=right | 1.5 km || 
|}

487901–488000 

|-bgcolor=#d6d6d6
| 487901 ||  || — || July 2, 2014 || Kitt Peak || Spacewatch || — || align=right | 3.0 km || 
|-id=902 bgcolor=#d6d6d6
| 487902 ||  || — || May 8, 2013 || Haleakala || Pan-STARRS || TEL || align=right | 1.1 km || 
|-id=903 bgcolor=#E9E9E9
| 487903 ||  || — || October 2, 2006 || Mount Lemmon || Mount Lemmon Survey || — || align=right | 2.1 km || 
|-id=904 bgcolor=#d6d6d6
| 487904 ||  || — || April 15, 2013 || Haleakala || Pan-STARRS || — || align=right | 3.1 km || 
|-id=905 bgcolor=#d6d6d6
| 487905 ||  || — || July 27, 2014 || Haleakala || Pan-STARRS || — || align=right | 2.4 km || 
|-id=906 bgcolor=#E9E9E9
| 487906 ||  || — || February 9, 2008 || Mount Lemmon || Mount Lemmon Survey || WIT || align=right data-sort-value="0.93" | 930 m || 
|-id=907 bgcolor=#E9E9E9
| 487907 ||  || — || December 4, 2007 || Catalina || CSS || (5) || align=right data-sort-value="0.74" | 740 m || 
|-id=908 bgcolor=#E9E9E9
| 487908 ||  || — || May 13, 2009 || Mount Lemmon || Mount Lemmon Survey || — || align=right | 1.6 km || 
|-id=909 bgcolor=#E9E9E9
| 487909 ||  || — || September 14, 2006 || Kitt Peak || Spacewatch || — || align=right | 2.8 km || 
|-id=910 bgcolor=#d6d6d6
| 487910 ||  || — || June 27, 2014 || Haleakala || Pan-STARRS || EOS || align=right | 1.9 km || 
|-id=911 bgcolor=#d6d6d6
| 487911 ||  || — || November 8, 2010 || Mount Lemmon || Mount Lemmon Survey || EOS || align=right | 1.7 km || 
|-id=912 bgcolor=#E9E9E9
| 487912 ||  || — || November 24, 2011 || Haleakala || Pan-STARRS || — || align=right | 1.3 km || 
|-id=913 bgcolor=#fefefe
| 487913 ||  || — || August 8, 2004 || Socorro || LINEAR || — || align=right data-sort-value="0.90" | 900 m || 
|-id=914 bgcolor=#E9E9E9
| 487914 ||  || — || September 16, 2006 || Catalina || CSS || — || align=right | 2.0 km || 
|-id=915 bgcolor=#E9E9E9
| 487915 ||  || — || February 26, 2008 || Mount Lemmon || Mount Lemmon Survey || GEF || align=right | 1.2 km || 
|-id=916 bgcolor=#d6d6d6
| 487916 ||  || — || December 24, 2005 || Socorro || LINEAR || — || align=right | 3.2 km || 
|-id=917 bgcolor=#d6d6d6
| 487917 ||  || — || August 16, 2009 || La Sagra || OAM Obs. || — || align=right | 3.1 km || 
|-id=918 bgcolor=#d6d6d6
| 487918 ||  || — || August 6, 2010 || WISE || WISE || — || align=right | 2.5 km || 
|-id=919 bgcolor=#E9E9E9
| 487919 ||  || — || September 25, 2007 || Mount Lemmon || Mount Lemmon Survey || MAR || align=right data-sort-value="0.83" | 830 m || 
|-id=920 bgcolor=#E9E9E9
| 487920 ||  || — || November 2, 2007 || Kitt Peak || Spacewatch || KON || align=right | 2.2 km || 
|-id=921 bgcolor=#d6d6d6
| 487921 ||  || — || August 29, 2009 || Kitt Peak || Spacewatch || — || align=right | 3.3 km || 
|-id=922 bgcolor=#d6d6d6
| 487922 ||  || — || January 4, 2006 || Mount Lemmon || Mount Lemmon Survey || — || align=right | 2.4 km || 
|-id=923 bgcolor=#fefefe
| 487923 ||  || — || May 22, 2011 || Mount Lemmon || Mount Lemmon Survey || — || align=right data-sort-value="0.64" | 640 m || 
|-id=924 bgcolor=#d6d6d6
| 487924 ||  || — || April 25, 2007 || Kitt Peak || Spacewatch || — || align=right | 4.1 km || 
|-id=925 bgcolor=#fefefe
| 487925 ||  || — || September 24, 2008 || Mount Lemmon || Mount Lemmon Survey || — || align=right data-sort-value="0.94" | 940 m || 
|-id=926 bgcolor=#E9E9E9
| 487926 ||  || — || December 31, 2007 || Mount Lemmon || Mount Lemmon Survey || — || align=right | 1.6 km || 
|-id=927 bgcolor=#d6d6d6
| 487927 ||  || — || July 28, 2014 || Haleakala || Pan-STARRS || VER || align=right | 1.8 km || 
|-id=928 bgcolor=#fefefe
| 487928 ||  || — || October 10, 2007 || Mount Lemmon || Mount Lemmon Survey || — || align=right data-sort-value="0.85" | 850 m || 
|-id=929 bgcolor=#E9E9E9
| 487929 ||  || — || September 3, 2010 || Socorro || LINEAR || GEF || align=right | 1.3 km || 
|-id=930 bgcolor=#E9E9E9
| 487930 ||  || — || November 11, 2006 || Mount Lemmon || Mount Lemmon Survey || — || align=right | 2.9 km || 
|-id=931 bgcolor=#E9E9E9
| 487931 ||  || — || September 20, 1998 || Xinglong || SCAP || — || align=right | 1.3 km || 
|-id=932 bgcolor=#d6d6d6
| 487932 ||  || — || February 26, 2012 || Haleakala || Pan-STARRS || EOS || align=right | 2.1 km || 
|-id=933 bgcolor=#fefefe
| 487933 ||  || — || March 12, 2007 || Kitt Peak || Spacewatch || — || align=right data-sort-value="0.65" | 650 m || 
|-id=934 bgcolor=#E9E9E9
| 487934 ||  || — || September 28, 2011 || Mount Lemmon || Mount Lemmon Survey || — || align=right | 1.0 km || 
|-id=935 bgcolor=#E9E9E9
| 487935 ||  || — || October 26, 2011 || Haleakala || Pan-STARRS || — || align=right | 1.5 km || 
|-id=936 bgcolor=#E9E9E9
| 487936 ||  || — || October 25, 2011 || Haleakala || Pan-STARRS || — || align=right | 1.9 km || 
|-id=937 bgcolor=#E9E9E9
| 487937 ||  || — || December 28, 2003 || Socorro || LINEAR || — || align=right | 1.2 km || 
|-id=938 bgcolor=#E9E9E9
| 487938 ||  || — || September 30, 2006 || Mount Lemmon || Mount Lemmon Survey || WIT || align=right | 1.0 km || 
|-id=939 bgcolor=#E9E9E9
| 487939 ||  || — || July 29, 2006 || Siding Spring || SSS || JUN || align=right data-sort-value="0.97" | 970 m || 
|-id=940 bgcolor=#E9E9E9
| 487940 ||  || — || February 3, 2009 || Kitt Peak || Spacewatch || — || align=right | 1.3 km || 
|-id=941 bgcolor=#E9E9E9
| 487941 ||  || — || August 18, 2006 || Kitt Peak || Spacewatch || — || align=right | 1.3 km || 
|-id=942 bgcolor=#E9E9E9
| 487942 ||  || — || December 16, 2011 || Haleakala || Pan-STARRS || MAR || align=right | 1.1 km || 
|-id=943 bgcolor=#E9E9E9
| 487943 ||  || — || May 29, 2009 || Kitt Peak || Spacewatch || — || align=right | 2.2 km || 
|-id=944 bgcolor=#d6d6d6
| 487944 ||  || — || February 28, 2012 || Haleakala || Pan-STARRS || HYG || align=right | 3.3 km || 
|-id=945 bgcolor=#E9E9E9
| 487945 ||  || — || March 12, 2008 || Kitt Peak || Spacewatch || HOF || align=right | 2.5 km || 
|-id=946 bgcolor=#d6d6d6
| 487946 ||  || — || June 19, 2009 || Kitt Peak || Spacewatch || — || align=right | 4.2 km || 
|-id=947 bgcolor=#fefefe
| 487947 ||  || — || March 3, 2006 || Kitt Peak || Spacewatch || — || align=right data-sort-value="0.80" | 800 m || 
|-id=948 bgcolor=#E9E9E9
| 487948 ||  || — || November 2, 2011 || Mount Lemmon || Mount Lemmon Survey || — || align=right | 1.0 km || 
|-id=949 bgcolor=#E9E9E9
| 487949 ||  || — || September 27, 2011 || Mount Lemmon || Mount Lemmon Survey || — || align=right | 1.4 km || 
|-id=950 bgcolor=#d6d6d6
| 487950 ||  || — || December 27, 2005 || Kitt Peak || Spacewatch || — || align=right | 1.8 km || 
|-id=951 bgcolor=#E9E9E9
| 487951 ||  || — || September 21, 2001 || Kitt Peak || Spacewatch || HOF || align=right | 2.9 km || 
|-id=952 bgcolor=#d6d6d6
| 487952 ||  || — || December 15, 2006 || Kitt Peak || Spacewatch || — || align=right | 2.0 km || 
|-id=953 bgcolor=#d6d6d6
| 487953 ||  || — || January 8, 2011 || Mount Lemmon || Mount Lemmon Survey || — || align=right | 3.1 km || 
|-id=954 bgcolor=#d6d6d6
| 487954 ||  || — || February 26, 2012 || Kitt Peak || Spacewatch || — || align=right | 3.0 km || 
|-id=955 bgcolor=#E9E9E9
| 487955 ||  || — || October 20, 2007 || Mount Lemmon || Mount Lemmon Survey || — || align=right data-sort-value="0.82" | 820 m || 
|-id=956 bgcolor=#E9E9E9
| 487956 ||  || — || October 21, 2006 || Kitt Peak || Spacewatch || — || align=right | 2.2 km || 
|-id=957 bgcolor=#E9E9E9
| 487957 ||  || — || October 13, 2007 || Catalina || CSS || — || align=right | 1.3 km || 
|-id=958 bgcolor=#fefefe
| 487958 ||  || — || January 17, 2007 || Kitt Peak || Spacewatch || — || align=right data-sort-value="0.60" | 600 m || 
|-id=959 bgcolor=#d6d6d6
| 487959 ||  || — || March 12, 2007 || Kitt Peak || Spacewatch || EMA || align=right | 2.7 km || 
|-id=960 bgcolor=#E9E9E9
| 487960 ||  || — || September 17, 2006 || Catalina || CSS || — || align=right | 2.3 km || 
|-id=961 bgcolor=#E9E9E9
| 487961 ||  || — || October 23, 2011 || Haleakala || Pan-STARRS || — || align=right | 1.4 km || 
|-id=962 bgcolor=#d6d6d6
| 487962 ||  || — || March 27, 2008 || Mount Lemmon || Mount Lemmon Survey || — || align=right | 2.0 km || 
|-id=963 bgcolor=#fefefe
| 487963 ||  || — || April 1, 2014 || Mount Lemmon || Mount Lemmon Survey || — || align=right data-sort-value="0.71" | 710 m || 
|-id=964 bgcolor=#d6d6d6
| 487964 ||  || — || December 11, 2004 || Kitt Peak || Spacewatch || — || align=right | 3.1 km || 
|-id=965 bgcolor=#E9E9E9
| 487965 ||  || — || November 18, 2011 || Catalina || CSS || — || align=right | 1.2 km || 
|-id=966 bgcolor=#d6d6d6
| 487966 ||  || — || September 13, 2009 || La Sagra || OAM Obs. || — || align=right | 3.6 km || 
|-id=967 bgcolor=#fefefe
| 487967 ||  || — || September 29, 2011 || Mount Lemmon || Mount Lemmon Survey || SUL || align=right | 2.2 km || 
|-id=968 bgcolor=#E9E9E9
| 487968 ||  || — || October 5, 2003 || Kitt Peak || Spacewatch || — || align=right | 1.1 km || 
|-id=969 bgcolor=#fefefe
| 487969 ||  || — || October 21, 2008 || Kitt Peak || Spacewatch || NYS || align=right data-sort-value="0.72" | 720 m || 
|-id=970 bgcolor=#fefefe
| 487970 ||  || — || December 17, 2001 || Socorro || LINEAR || — || align=right data-sort-value="0.66" | 660 m || 
|-id=971 bgcolor=#d6d6d6
| 487971 ||  || — || April 16, 2013 || Haleakala || Pan-STARRS || — || align=right | 3.0 km || 
|-id=972 bgcolor=#d6d6d6
| 487972 ||  || — || October 9, 2015 || Haleakala || Pan-STARRS || — || align=right | 3.6 km || 
|-id=973 bgcolor=#d6d6d6
| 487973 ||  || — || February 25, 2007 || Kitt Peak || Spacewatch || EOS || align=right | 1.5 km || 
|-id=974 bgcolor=#E9E9E9
| 487974 ||  || — || April 29, 2006 || Kitt Peak || Spacewatch || — || align=right data-sort-value="0.99" | 990 m || 
|-id=975 bgcolor=#d6d6d6
| 487975 ||  || — || May 12, 2013 || Haleakala || Pan-STARRS || — || align=right | 3.1 km || 
|-id=976 bgcolor=#E9E9E9
| 487976 ||  || — || November 24, 2011 || Catalina || CSS || EUN || align=right | 1.1 km || 
|-id=977 bgcolor=#E9E9E9
| 487977 ||  || — || May 6, 2014 || Haleakala || Pan-STARRS || — || align=right | 2.2 km || 
|-id=978 bgcolor=#d6d6d6
| 487978 ||  || — || November 5, 2010 || Mount Lemmon || Mount Lemmon Survey || — || align=right | 3.1 km || 
|-id=979 bgcolor=#fefefe
| 487979 ||  || — || February 4, 2005 || Kitt Peak || Spacewatch || NYS || align=right data-sort-value="0.72" | 720 m || 
|-id=980 bgcolor=#E9E9E9
| 487980 ||  || — || October 9, 2007 || Kitt Peak || Spacewatch || — || align=right | 1.0 km || 
|-id=981 bgcolor=#d6d6d6
| 487981 ||  || — || December 25, 2005 || Mount Lemmon || Mount Lemmon Survey || THM || align=right | 1.6 km || 
|-id=982 bgcolor=#d6d6d6
| 487982 ||  || — || November 9, 1999 || Kitt Peak || Spacewatch || — || align=right | 1.9 km || 
|-id=983 bgcolor=#d6d6d6
| 487983 ||  || — || March 17, 2007 || Kitt Peak || Spacewatch || — || align=right | 2.9 km || 
|-id=984 bgcolor=#d6d6d6
| 487984 ||  || — || December 10, 2010 || Kitt Peak || Spacewatch || — || align=right | 3.8 km || 
|-id=985 bgcolor=#E9E9E9
| 487985 ||  || — || January 20, 2008 || Kitt Peak || Spacewatch || — || align=right | 1.8 km || 
|-id=986 bgcolor=#d6d6d6
| 487986 ||  || — || July 29, 2014 || Haleakala || Pan-STARRS || EOS || align=right | 2.1 km || 
|-id=987 bgcolor=#E9E9E9
| 487987 ||  || — || September 25, 2006 || Anderson Mesa || LONEOS || — || align=right | 2.5 km || 
|-id=988 bgcolor=#d6d6d6
| 487988 ||  || — || November 5, 2010 || Mount Lemmon || Mount Lemmon Survey || LIX || align=right | 4.3 km || 
|-id=989 bgcolor=#E9E9E9
| 487989 ||  || — || September 26, 2006 || Catalina || CSS || — || align=right | 2.0 km || 
|-id=990 bgcolor=#fefefe
| 487990 ||  || — || June 5, 2011 || Mount Lemmon || Mount Lemmon Survey || — || align=right | 1.0 km || 
|-id=991 bgcolor=#E9E9E9
| 487991 ||  || — || October 26, 2011 || Haleakala || Pan-STARRS || MAR || align=right | 1.0 km || 
|-id=992 bgcolor=#d6d6d6
| 487992 ||  || — || April 15, 2007 || Catalina || CSS || (1118) || align=right | 3.8 km || 
|-id=993 bgcolor=#d6d6d6
| 487993 ||  || — || March 29, 2012 || Haleakala || Pan-STARRS || — || align=right | 2.5 km || 
|-id=994 bgcolor=#d6d6d6
| 487994 ||  || — || February 21, 2006 || Catalina || CSS || — || align=right | 2.8 km || 
|-id=995 bgcolor=#d6d6d6
| 487995 ||  || — || September 21, 2004 || Socorro || LINEAR || — || align=right | 2.8 km || 
|-id=996 bgcolor=#d6d6d6
| 487996 ||  || — || December 11, 2001 || Socorro || LINEAR || — || align=right | 2.5 km || 
|-id=997 bgcolor=#E9E9E9
| 487997 ||  || — || October 26, 2011 || Haleakala || Pan-STARRS || — || align=right | 1.4 km || 
|-id=998 bgcolor=#E9E9E9
| 487998 ||  || — || September 28, 2006 || Kitt Peak || Spacewatch || — || align=right | 1.6 km || 
|-id=999 bgcolor=#d6d6d6
| 487999 ||  || — || December 1, 2005 || Kitt Peak || Spacewatch || — || align=right | 2.3 km || 
|-id=000 bgcolor=#E9E9E9
| 488000 ||  || — || September 30, 2006 || Mount Lemmon || Mount Lemmon Survey || — || align=right | 1.3 km || 
|}

References

External links 
 Discovery Circumstances: Numbered Minor Planets (485001)–(490000) (IAU Minor Planet Center)

0487